= Rosario de Lerma Department =

Rosario de Lerma
- Department
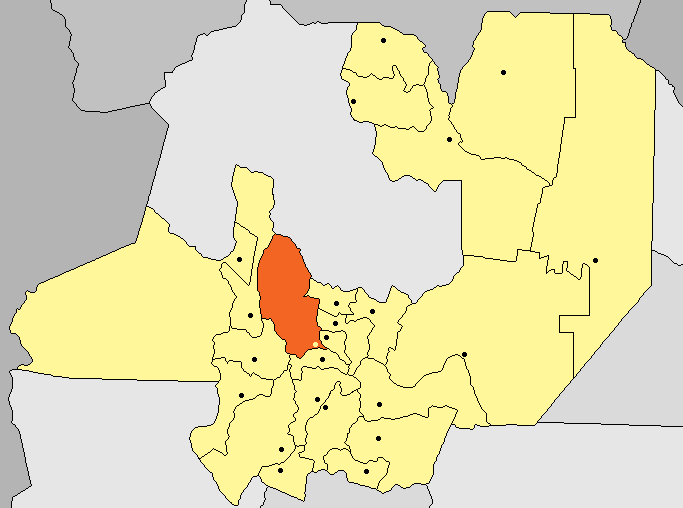
- Coordinates: 24°58′47″S 65°34′47″W
- Country: Argentina
- Province: Salta
- Capital: Rosario de Lerma

Area
  - Total: 5,110 km^{2} (1,970 sq mi)

Population (2001)
  - Total: 33,741
  - Density: 6.60/km^{2} (17.1/sq mi)

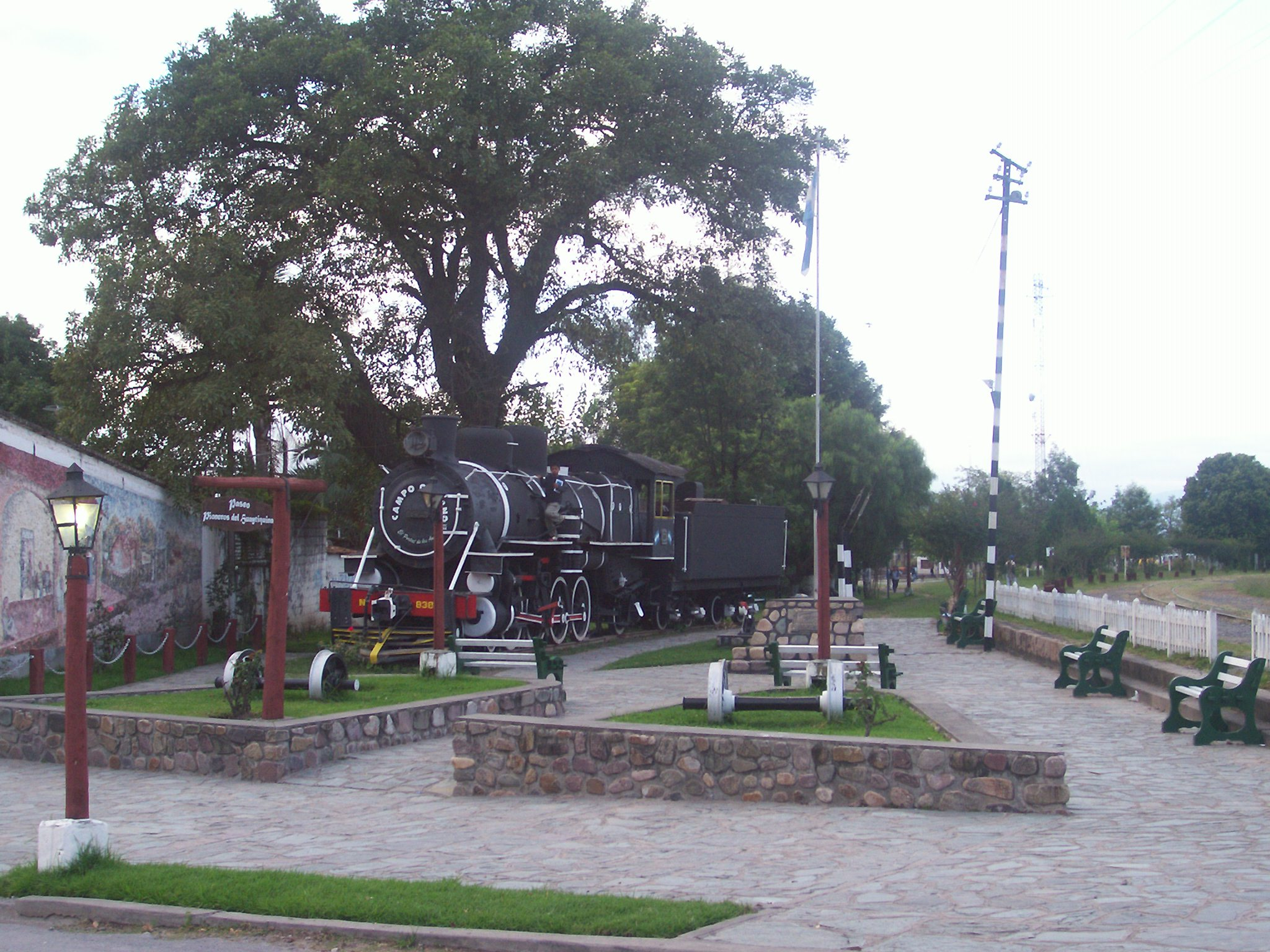
An old locomotive at Campo Quijano station

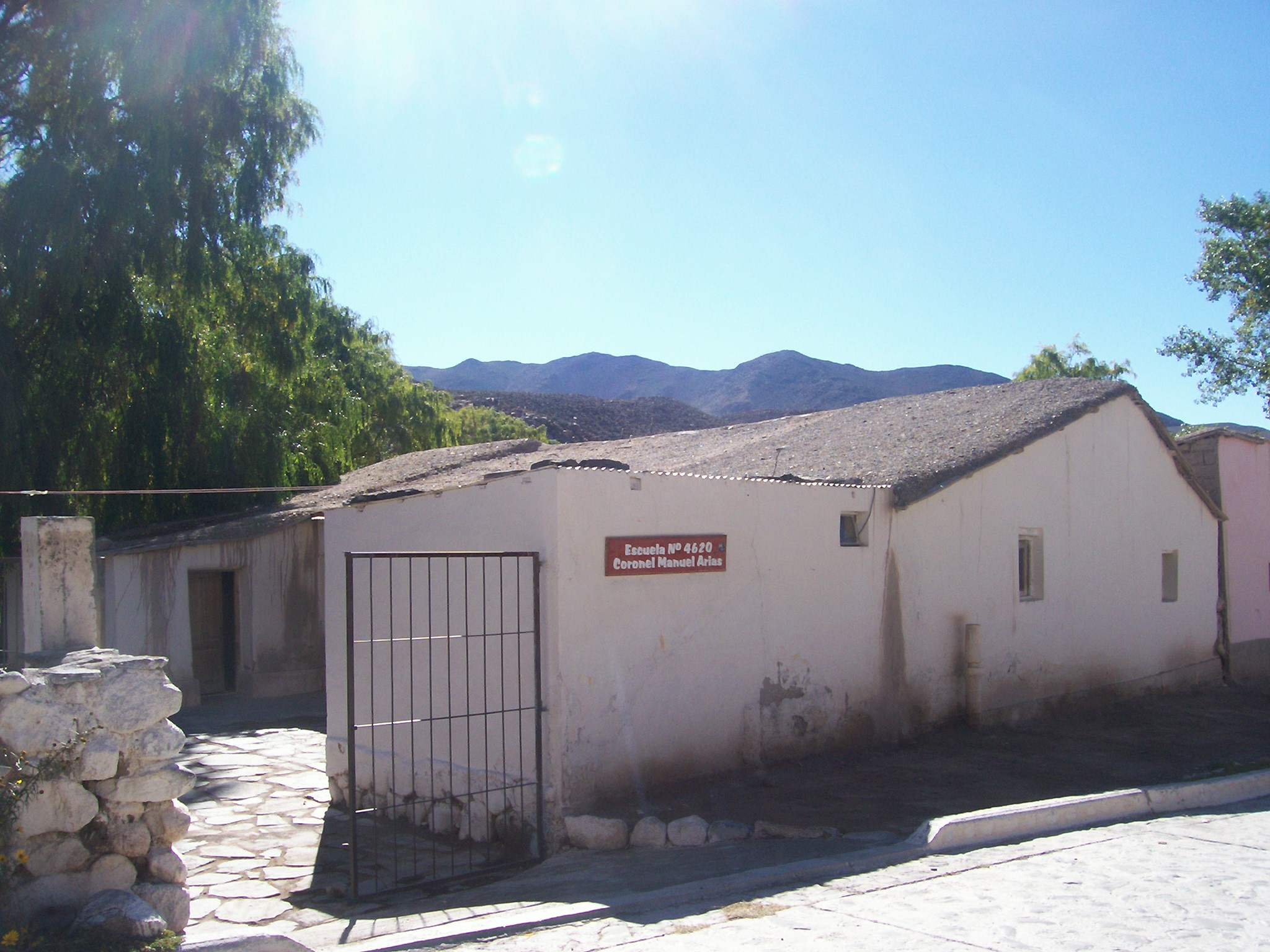
A school in Santa Rosa de Tastil

Rosario de Lerma is a department located in Salta Province, Argentina. Its main settlements are Rosario de Lerma (the capital) and Campo Quijano.

== Geography ==
=== Overview ===
The department is located in the north-central side of the province, near the Andes, and includes part of the Puna de Atacama. It borders with Jujuy Province and the departments of La Caldera, Capital, Cerrillos, Chicoana, Cachi and La Poma. The territorial strip linking the northern and southern side of La Poma Department separates Rosario de Lerma from Los Andes Department.

=== Places ===
Towns and municipalities:

- Rosario de Lerma (17,871 inh.)
- Campo Quijano (7,274 inh.)
- La Silleta (1,256 inh.)
- Santa Rosa de Tastil (11 inh.)

Other localities and places:

- Abra Muñano
- Alfarcito
- Cachiñal
- Chorrillos
- Diego de Almagro
- El Alisal
- El Rosal
- El Manzano
- Gobernador Solá
- Incahuasi
- Incamayo
- Ingeniero Maury
- Las Cuevas
- Manizales
- Meseta
- Puerta Tastil
- San Bernardo de las Zorras
- Tacuara
- Villa Angélica

== See also ==
- Tren a las Nubes
- Salta–Antofagasta railway
