= List of highest railways by country =

This is a list of the highest railways by country. It includes the name of the railway, its highest point and highest elevation and its opening year.

== List ==
Country	Railway line	Highest point	Highest elevation	Opened
China	Xining-Golmud-Lhasa	Tanggula	5,068 m (16,627 ft)	2006
Peru	Lima-Huancayo	Ticlio	4,829 m (15,843 ft)	1893
Bolivia	Rio Mulatos-Potosí	Cóndor	4,786 m (15,702 ft)	
United States	Manitou and Pike's Peak Railway	Pikes Peak Summit	4,301 m (14,111 ft)	1891
Argentina	Salta–Antofagasta	Viaducto La Polvorilla	4,220 m (13,845 ft)	1948
Ecuador	Quito-Guayaquil	Urbina	3,609 m (11,841 ft)	1908
China	Lanzhou–Xinjiang High-Speed Railway	Qilianshan No.2 Tunnel	3,608 m (11,837 ft)	2014
Switzerland	Jungfrau Railway	Jungfraujoch	3,454 m (11,332 ft)	1912
Kenya	Uganda Railway	Baringo County	2,785 m (9,137 ft)	1930
Germany	Bavarian Zugspitze Railway	Schneefernerhaus	2,650 m (8,694 ft)	1930
Taiwan	Alishan Forest Railway	Chushan	2,451 m (8,041 ft)	1986
France	Tramway du Mont-Blanc	Refuge-du-Nid-d'Aigle	2,412 m (7,913 ft)	1909 (Note: Terminus extended from 2,372 m (7,782 ft) to 2,412 m (7,913 ft) in 2026.)
Eritrea	Massawa–Asmara Railway	Asmara	2,394 m (7,854 ft)	1911
Ethiopia	Addis Ababa–Djibouti Railway	Addis Ababa	2,293 m (7,523 ft)	2018
India	Darjeeling Himalayan Railway	Ghum	2,257 m (7,405 ft)	1880
Pakistan	Zhob Valley Railway	Kan Mehtarzai Railway Station	2,224 m (7,297 ft)	1921
Spain	Vall de Núria	Vall de Núria Rack Railway	1,968 m (6,457 ft)	1931
Australia	Skitube	Bullock Terminal	1,905 m (6,250 ft)	1987
Sri Lanka	Main Line (Sri Lanka)	Pattipola	1,892 m (6,207 ft)	1894
Austria	Schneeberg Railway	Hochschneeberg	1,792 m (5,879 ft)	1897
Georgia	Borjomi-Bakuriani	Bakuriani	1,650 m (5,413 ft)	1902
Italy	Brenner Line	Brenner	1,371 m (4,498 ft)	1867
Slovakia	Tatra Electric Railway	Štrbské Pleso	1,350 m (4,429 ft)	1896
Japan	Koumi Line	Nobeyama	1,346 m (4,416 ft)	1935
Canada	Canadian Pacific Railway Mountain Subdivision	Rogers Pass	1,330 m (4,364 ft)	1889
Russia	Baikal-Amur Mainline	Mururin Pass	1,323 m (4,341 ft)	1984
Bulgaria	Septemvri-Dobrinishte narrow gauge line	Avramovo	1,267 m (4,157 ft)	1939
Norway	Bergen Line	Finse	1,222 m (4,009 ft)	1908
United Kingdom	Snowdon Mountain Railway	Summit	1,065 m (3,494 ft)	1896
Czech Republic	Strakonice-Volary line	Kubova Huť	997 m (3,271 ft)	1893
South Korea	Taebaek Line	Chujeon	901 m (2,956 ft)	1973
Poland	Izera railway	Szklarska Poręba (Jakuszyce)	886 m (2,907 ft)	1902
Portugal	Linha do Tua	Rossas railway station	849 m (2,785 ft)	1906 (Note: Opening year of the highest-point stretch; the opening year of the railway's first stretch was 1887.) (Note: Highest-point stretch closed in 1992; railway fully closed in 2008.)
Indonesia	Padalarang-Kasugihan	Nagreg	848 m (2,782 ft)	1890
New Zealand	North Island Main Trunk	Waiouru	832 m (2,730 ft)	1908
Slovenia	Ljubljana–Trieste	Postojna Gate	610 m (2,001 ft)	1856
Sweden	Mittbanan	Near Storlien	601 m (1,972 ft)	
Liechtenstein	Feldkirch–Buchs	Near Schaanwald	452 m (1,483 ft)	1872
Ireland	Mallow–Tralee line	Near Rathmore	150 m (492 ft)	1853

== See also ==
- Rail transport
- List of highest railways in the world
- List of countries by highest point
