= List of highest railways =

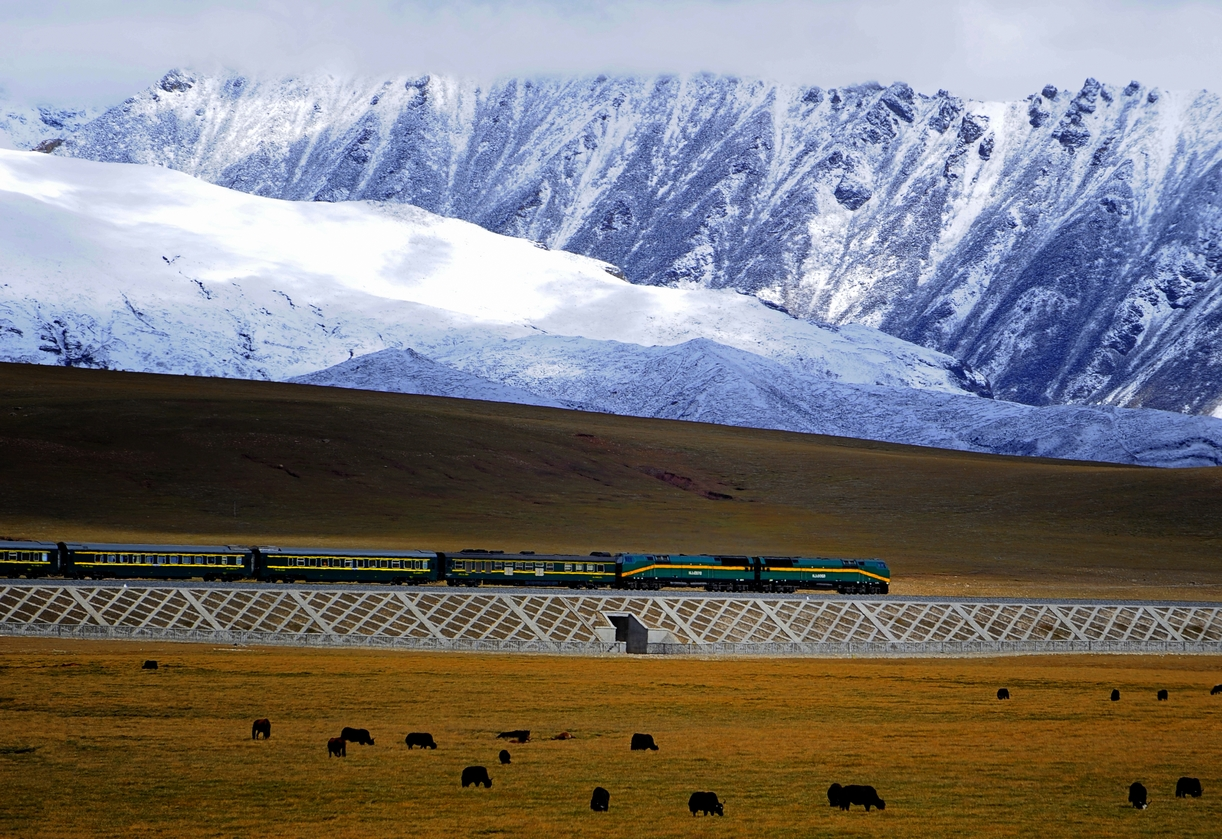
A train pulled by an NJ2 locomotive travels on the Qinghai–Tibet Railway.

This article lists the highest railways in the world. The table only includes non-cable passenger railways whose culminating point is over 3,000 metres above sea level, regardless of their location, gauge or type.

For simplicity, absolute elevation is the only criterion of this list, though two places at exactly the same elevation above sea level can have drastically different topographic or climatic conditions. For example, the permanent snow line is located at sea level near the poles, at 3,000 metres in the Alps and at 6,000 metres in some areas of the Andes and the Himalayas. The tree line also depends on latitude, thus making comparisons between elevations difficult on a world scale. At high altitudes, snow, cold, wind and harsh weather conditions make construction and maintenance an expensive challenge.

Before the opening of the Qinghai–Tibet Railway in China, currently the highest in the world, the highest three railways were located in the Andean countries of Peru and Bolivia. In the Alps, the Jungfrau Railway has the particularity of reaching an elevation that is higher than the local snow line.

For a list by country, without elevation cutoff, see List of highest railways by country.

== List ==
=== Current passenger railways ===
Railway line	Highest point	Highest elevation	Country	Opened	Notes
Xining-Golmud-Lhasa	Tanggula	5,068 m (16,627 ft)	China	2006	
Lima–Huancayo	Galera Summit Tunnel	4,783 m (15,692 ft)	Peru	1893	Highest railway in the Americas
Rio Mulatos–Potosí	Cóndor	4,786 m (15,702 ft)	Bolivia		
Cuzco-Lake Titicaca	La Raya	4,313 m (14,150 ft)	Peru		
Manitou and Pike's Peak Railway	Pikes Peak Summit	4,301 m (14,111 ft)	USA	1891 / 2017, 2021	Highest railway in North America. Reopened in 2021
Salta–Antofagasta	La Polvorilla	4,220 m (13,845 ft)	Argentina; Chile	1948	"Tren a las Nubes" tourist service between San Antonio de los Cobres and La Polvorilla
Quito-Guayaquil	Urbina	3,609 m (11,841 ft)	Ecuador	1908	Reopened 2011
Lanzhou–Xinjiang High-Speed Railway	Qilianshan No.2 Tunnel	3,608 m (11,837 ft)	China	2014	Highest high-speed railway
Jungfrau Railway	Jungfraujoch	3,454 m (11,332 ft)	Switzerland	1912	Highest railway in Europe, underground above 2,350 m.
Leadville, Colorado and Southern Railroad	Leadville	3,414 m (11,201 ft)	USA		Highest adhesion railway currently in operation in North America
Gornergrat Railway	Gornergrat	3,090 m (10,138 ft)	Switzerland	1898	Highest open-air railway in Europe
Cumbres and Toltec Scenic Railroad	Cumbres Pass	3,054 m (10,020 ft)	USA	1881	Highest narrow gauge railroad in North America

=== Closed railways ===
Railway line	Highest point	Highest elevation	Country	Opened / closed	Notes
Salta–Antofagasta	Abra Chorrillos	4,475 m (14,682 ft)	Argentina	1948	Freight only, formerly also a passenger railway. Actually only takes passengers till La Polvorilla
Arica–La Paz	General Lagos	4,257 m (13,967 ft)	Chile; Bolivia	1913 / 2005	
Argentine Central Railway	Mount McClellan	3,987 m (13,081 ft)	USA	1906 / 1918	Highest regular adhesion railway in the United States
Antofagasta-La Paz	Ascotán	3,956 m (12,979 ft)	Chile; Bolivia	1873	Freight only, formerly also a passenger railway
Denver South Park & Pacific	Alpine Tunnel	3,512 m (11,522 ft)	USA	1882 / 1910	
Mendoza–Los Andes	Los Caracoles	3,176 m (10,420 ft)	Argentina; Chile	1910 / 1984	
DRG&W Tennessee Pass Route	Tennessee Pass	3,116 m (10,223 ft)	USA	1881 / 1997	Out of service. Can be reactivated if traffic permits.

== See also ==
- Bhanupli–Leh line, railway project that would be the highest in the world
- List of highest railways by country
- List of highest railways in Europe
- List of railway stations
