= Naveira Castle =

- Castillo Naveira (Spanish)
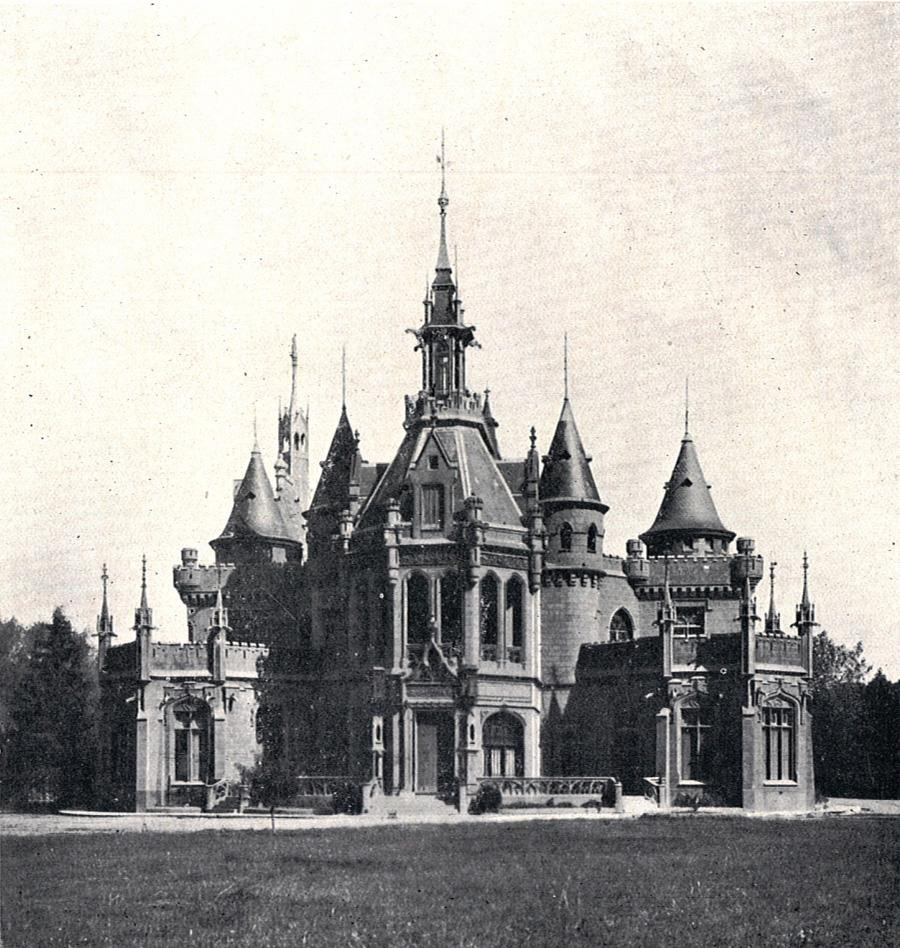
- Vintage view
- Click on the map for a fullscreen view

General information
- Location: Luján, Argentina
- Coordinates: 34°32′29.9″S 59°03′43.1″W

Naveira Castle (Spanish: Castillo Naveira), also known as Villa Cattaneo, is a historic residence located in Luján, Argentina.

== History ==
The estate on which the castle was later built was purchased in 1841 by Enrique Beschtedt, who settled there with his only daughter, Irene, in an earlier and more modest residence that he named 'San Enrique'.

Irene later married Domingo Fernández (1862–1953), who held various administrative and political positions. During his career, he promoted numerous development initiatives: in Bahía Blanca he founded the first Practical School of Agricultural Mechanics, while in Luján he established the first Agricultural Community. He was also a pioneer of the colonization of Patagonia, where he founded a sheep ranch. In 1917, he served as municipal commissioner of Luján, contributing to the restoration of the old Cabildo. He also became general administrator of the State Railways, playing a significant role in the expansion of Argentina's national railway network: in 1922 he designed and began the construction of the Salta–Antofagasta railway, which connected the regions of northern Argentina with the Pacific coast, and promoted the extension of the railway to Bariloche. He was also among the founders of the Railway Employees' Cooperative.

Irene and Domingo had nine children, the first of whom were born in the new Neo-Gothic residence the family had commissioned within the estate. The building was completed in 1897 according to the design of Belgian architect Ernesto Moreau.

In 1913, the Fernández Beschtedts sold the property, which was acquired by Matilde Golpe Brañas, widow of Manuel Naveira, with whom she had had a single son, José Roque Naveira Golpe. The latter commissioned an expansion of the castle, once again hiring Moreau for the project.
