= Salta–Antofagasta railway =

Railway line in Argentina and Chile

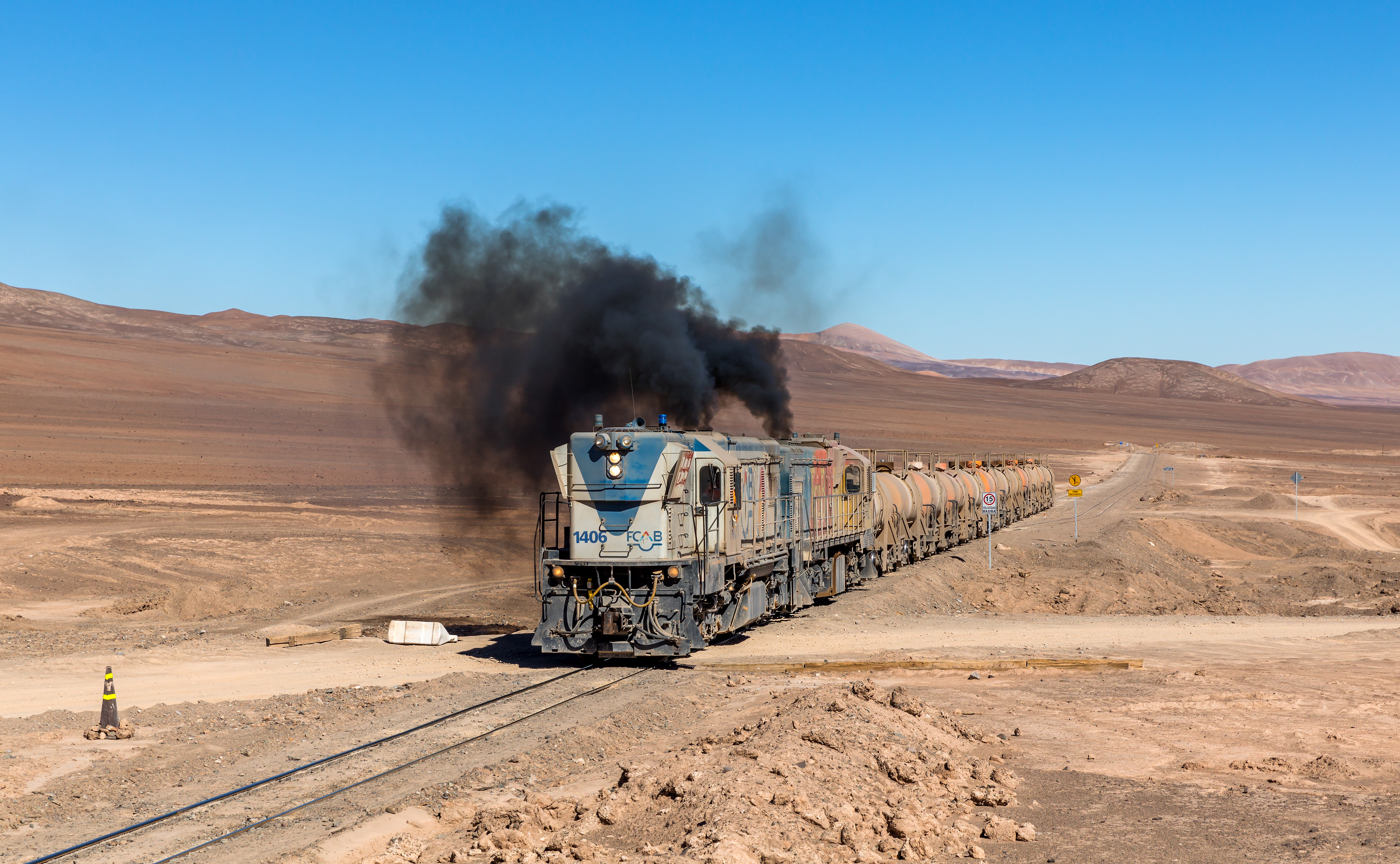
- A train near the passing loop of Pascua, 2019

Overview
- Other name: Huaytiquina
- Native name: Ramal Salta–Antofagasta
- Status: Active
- Owner: Government of Argentina; Government of Chile
- Line number: C-13 and C-14 (FA) Argentina; ? (EFE) Chile
- Locale: Argentina, Chile
- Termini: Salta (Argentina); Antofagasta (Chile)

Service
- Type: Inter-city and Commuter

History
- Opened: 20 February 1948

Technical
- Line length: 941 km (585 mi)
- Track gauge: 1,000 mm (3 ft 3 3/8 in) metre gauge
Route map
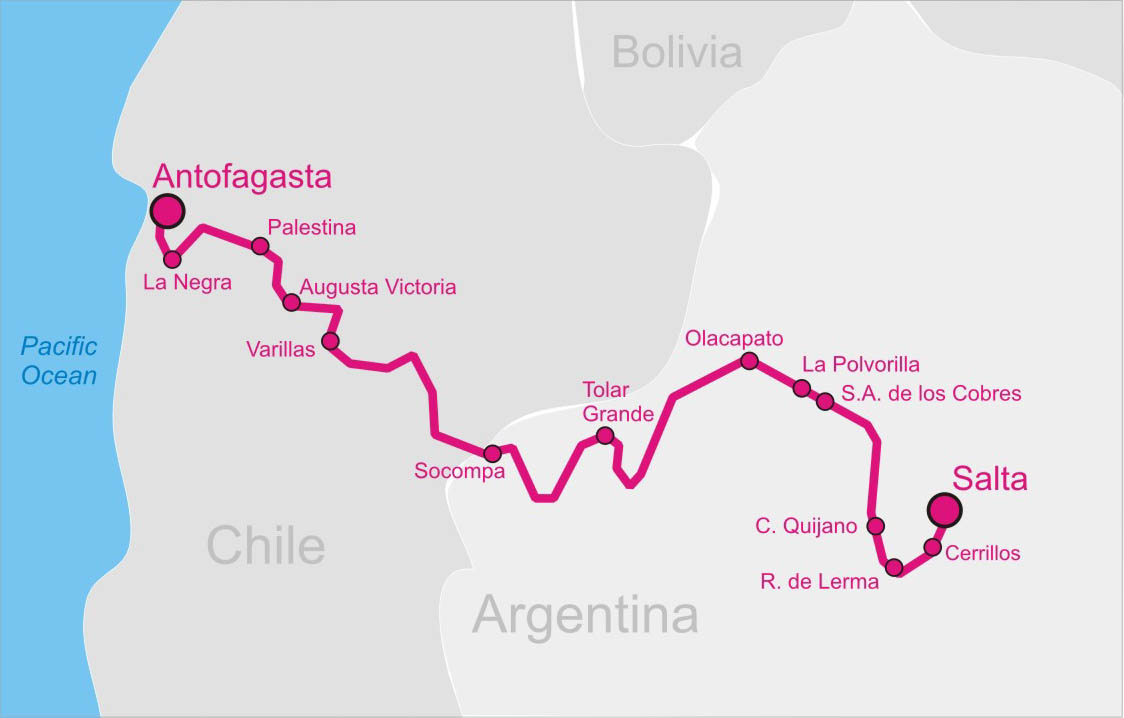

The Salta–Antofagasta railway, also named Huaytiquina, is a non-electrified single track railway line that links Argentina and Chile passing through the Andes. It is a 1,000 mm (3 ft 3 3/8 in) metre gauge railway with a total length of 941 km (571 in Argentina and 330 in Chile), connecting the city of Salta (Argentina) to the one of Antofagasta (Chile), on the Pacific Ocean, passing through the Puna de Atacama and Atacama Desert.

== Overview ==
The Argentine track (a brief portion -Salta-Cerrillos- of Ramal C-13, and mainly the Ramal C-14 Cerrillos-Socompa) is part of the Ferrocarril General Manuel Belgrano and 217 km of it are served by a tourist train named "Tren a las Nubes". The Chilean track (Socompa-Antofagasta) is part of the Ferrocarril de Antofagasta a Bolivia (FCAB). The "Huaytiquina", along with the Transandine (Mendoza-Los Andes to Santiago, closed since 1984 and pending reconstruction), represent the only railway links between the two countries.

With the highest point (La Polvorilla) at 4,220 metres (13,850 ft) amsl, the Huaytiquina is the fifth highest railway in the world and the third highest in South America.

== History ==
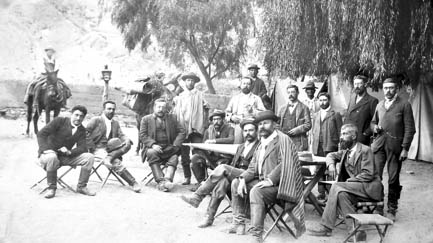
Engineer Richard Maury (third from left) with railway workers in Salta

The construction of the railway started in 1921, to connect the North of Argentina with Chile across the Andes, and to serve the borax mines of the area. The viaduct La Polvorilla, the highest of the line, was finished on 7 November 1932. The Chilean track was inaugurated in 1947 and the complete railway on 20 February 1948. The route was designed by American engineer Richard Maury, after whom one of the stations ("Ingeniero Maury") has been named.

The word "Huaytiquina" is the nickname of the railway. It refers to an ancient Andean mountain pass between Argentina and Chile, located just in north of Socompa and projected as line terminus. In 1923, after a Chilean request whose rail line arrived close to Socompa, the original project was abandoned and the Argentine route diverted to the current one.

In March 2022, the Government of Salta Province met with executives of Chilean company Ferronor with the purpose of bringing back a passenger service between Argentina and Chile. The project includes the reactivation of a 700-km line that joins both countries through Socompa Pass, located 3,876 m above sea level. There is a precedent of an agreement between both parties when Belgrano Cargas and Ferronor signed in 2000 to facilitate freight transport commerce.

== Route ==
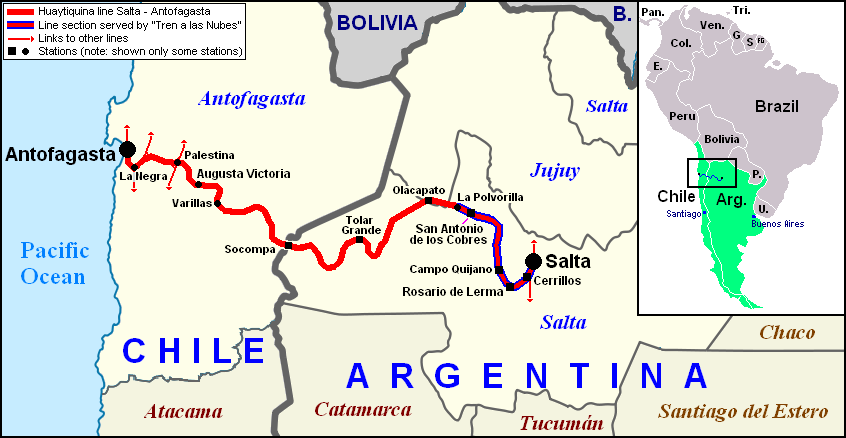
Map of the "Huaytiquina" within Argentina and Chile. The track marked with blue strips is served by the Tren a las Nubes. In the right, location of the line (blue) within South America.

The line crosses the north-western side of Salta Province, serving the suburban towns around Salta of Cerrillos, Rosario de Lerma and Campo Quijano, following part of the course of the Lerma Valley. It counts two zig zags, at El Alisal and Chorrillos, and two spiral loops between Tacuara and Diego de Almagro. Entering the plateau of Meseta, the railway passes near Santa Rosa de Tastil and the Pre-Inca archaeological site of Tastil.

It serves the town of San Antonio de los Cobres, in the middle of the Puna de Atacama, nearby copper mines. After the viaduct La Polvorilla, highest point of the line (4,220 m), the railway runs on the borders of Jujuy Province at Olacapato and, between Tolar Grande and Caipe, it crosses in the middle a dry lake named Salar de Arizaro. The station of Socompa, named after the Andean vulcan, is a bi-national station located between the Argentinian-Chilean frontier line.

Entering the Chilean territory, the rest of the line crosses the municipal territory of Antofagasta, located in the homonymous province and region. Varillas and Augusta Victoria have a short industrial rail branches, the one of Varillas serving Escondida mine. At Palestina station, the line crosses the junction railway Baquedano-Aguas Blancas, named FF.CC. Longitudinal (owned by Ferronor), linking the lines Antofagasta-La Paz and Antofagasta-Copiapó. Descending the western slopes of the Andes and the Atacama Desert, the "Huayitquina" reaches the industrial complex and village of La Negra and, after 22 km, the Pacific Ocean in the port city of Antofagasta.

== Train services ==
Due to a presence of mineral deposits in the Atacama area, most traffic on the line consists of freight trains transporting minerals such as lithium carbonate, borax, butane, pearlite, salt, ulexite, and brine. The most famous service is the sightseeing Tren a las Nubes (train to the clouds), running between Salta and La Polvorilla. Nowadays, apart from some suburban trains running from Salta to Campo Quijano, the Tren a las Nubes is the only passenger train serving the line, after the cancellation of the Tren Mixto Salta-Socompa, that once linked Socompa with Tucumán and Buenos Aires (Retiro Station), via Córdoba and Rosario. The Chilean part of the line, also served only by freight trains, was the site of a proposed commuter rail line on the route running through Antofagasta.

== Gallery ==
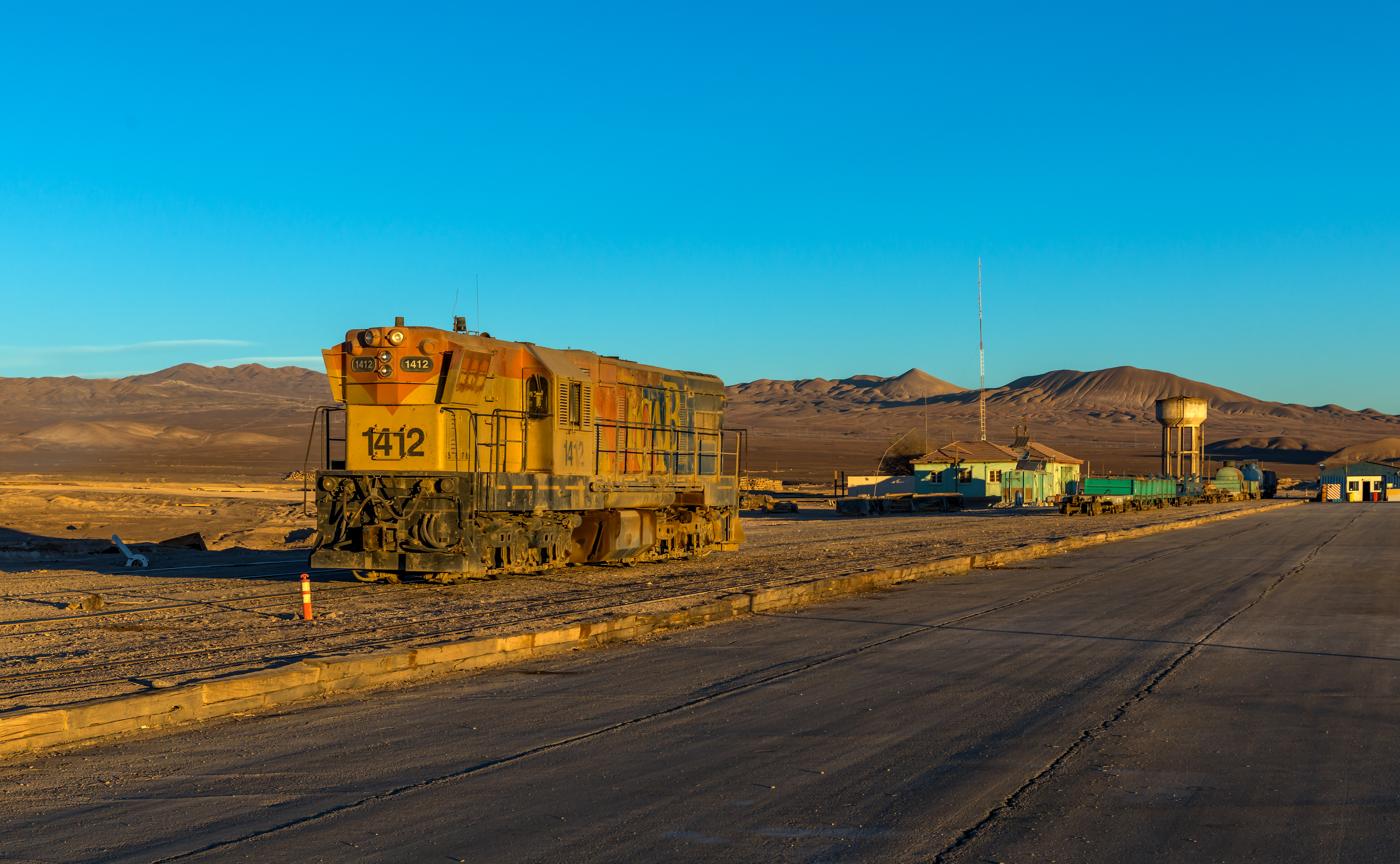
Train at Augusta Victoria station

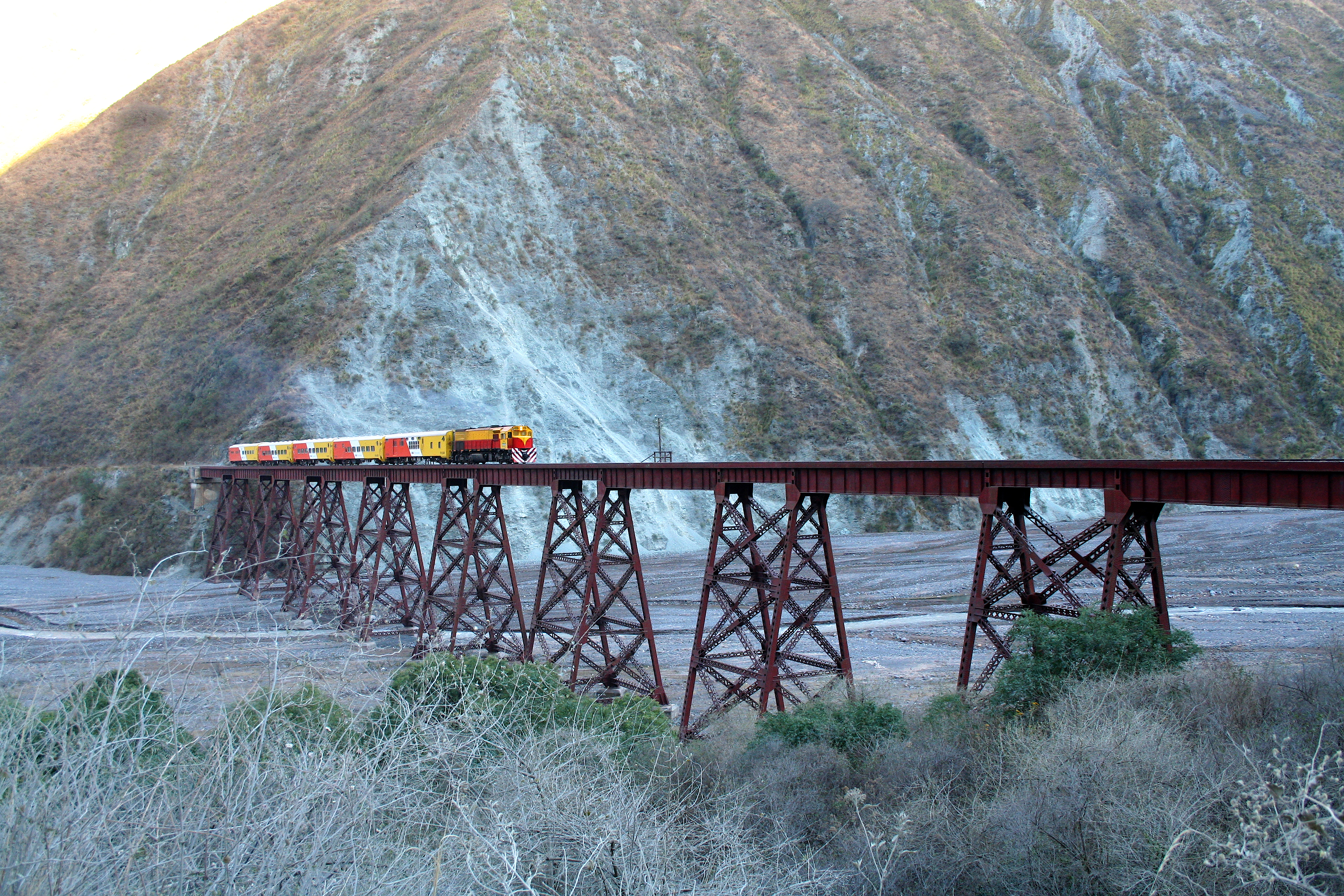
El Toro viaduct, between Campo Quijano and El Alisal

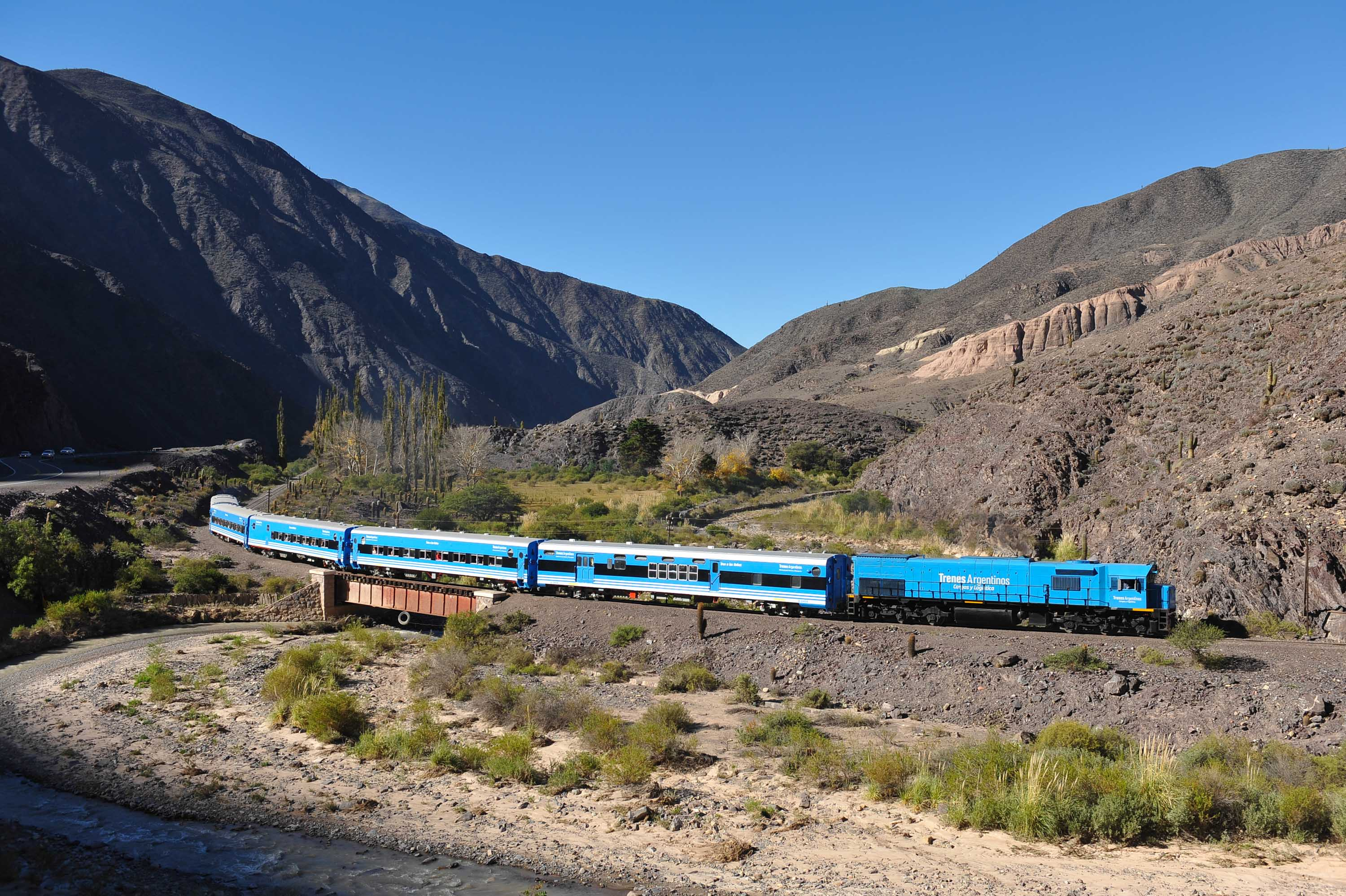
The Tren a las Nubes crossing a bridge

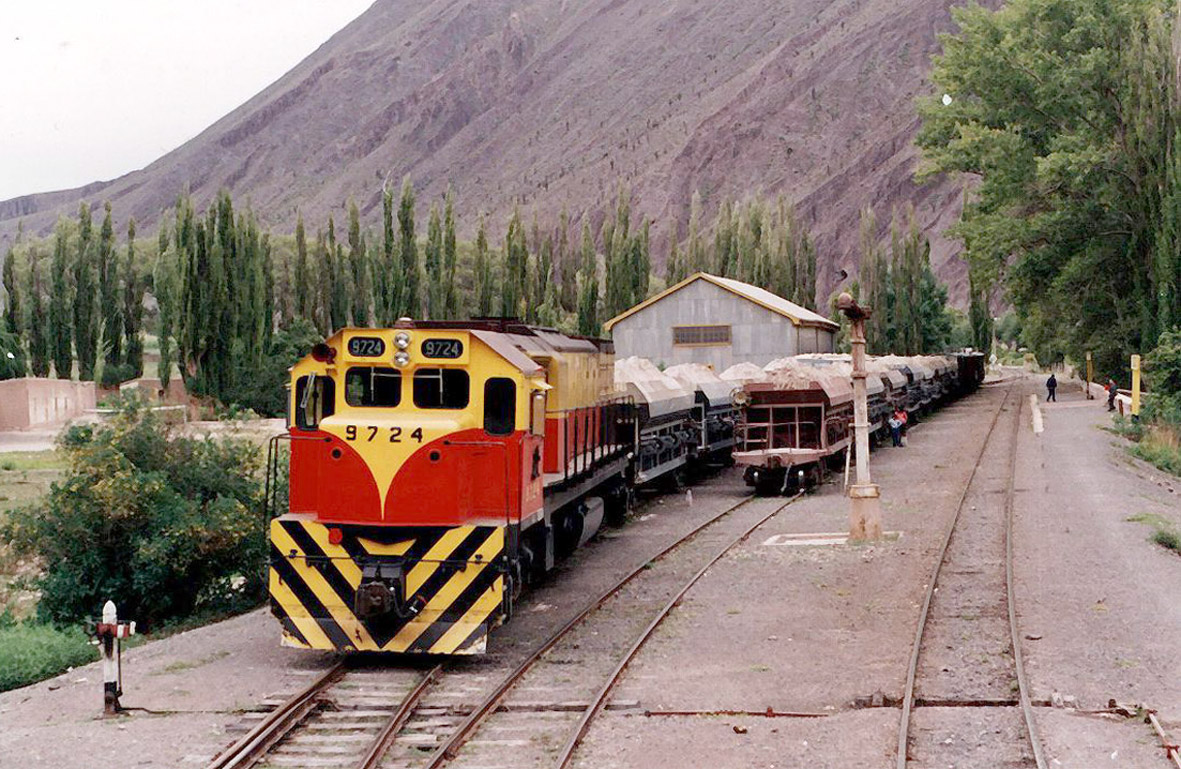
A cargo train at Ingeniero Maury station

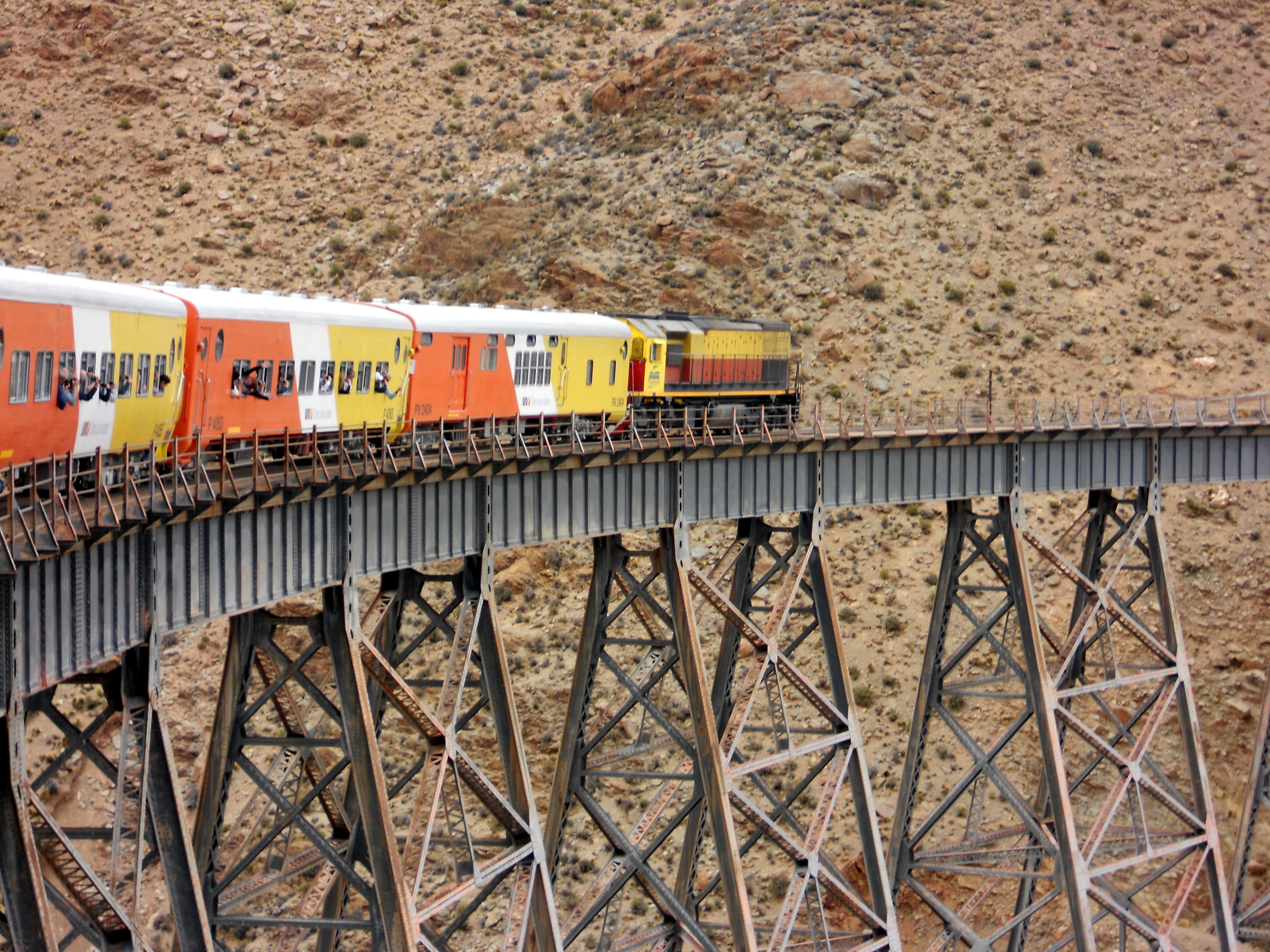
La Polvorilla viaduct

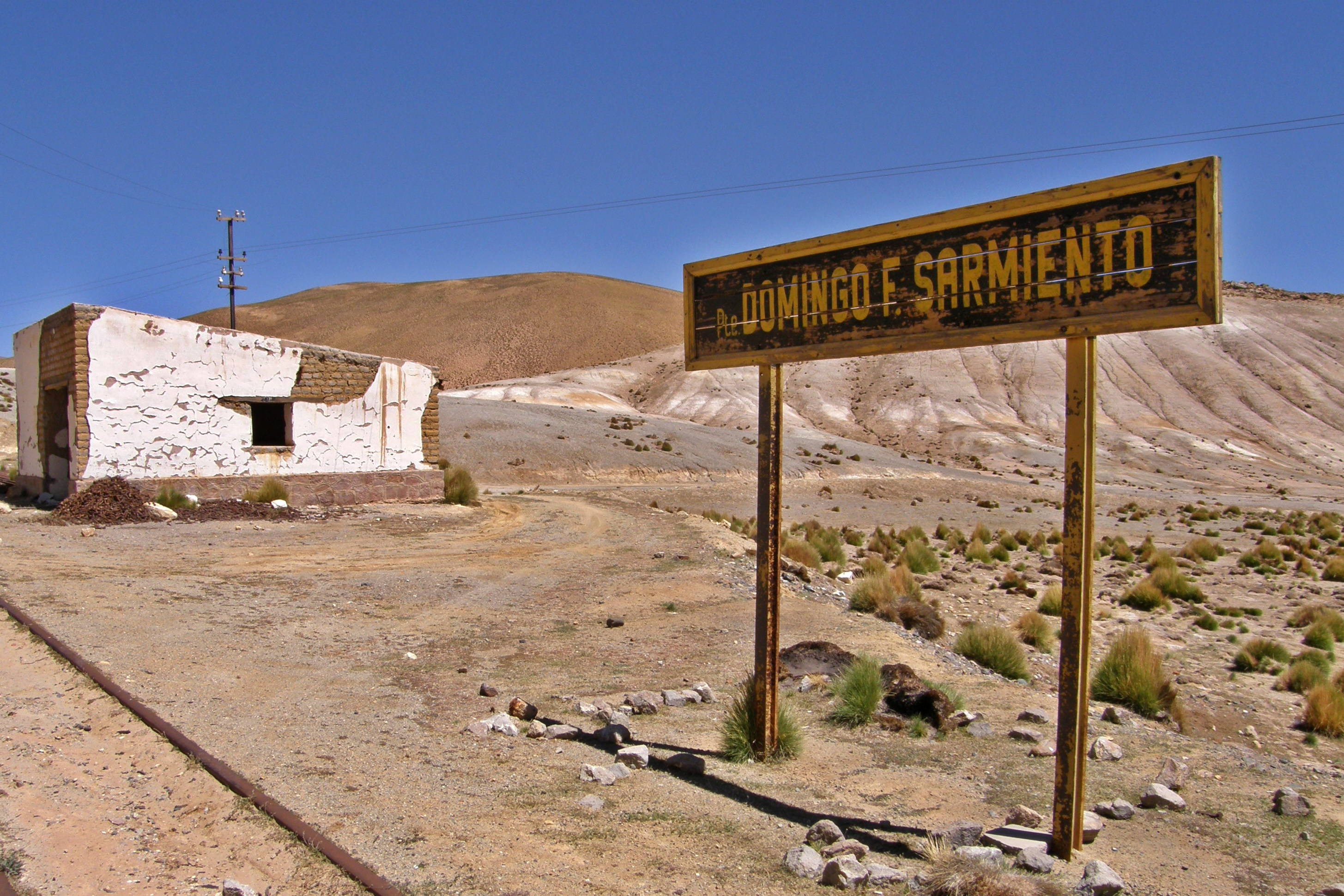
Domingo F. Sarmiento station

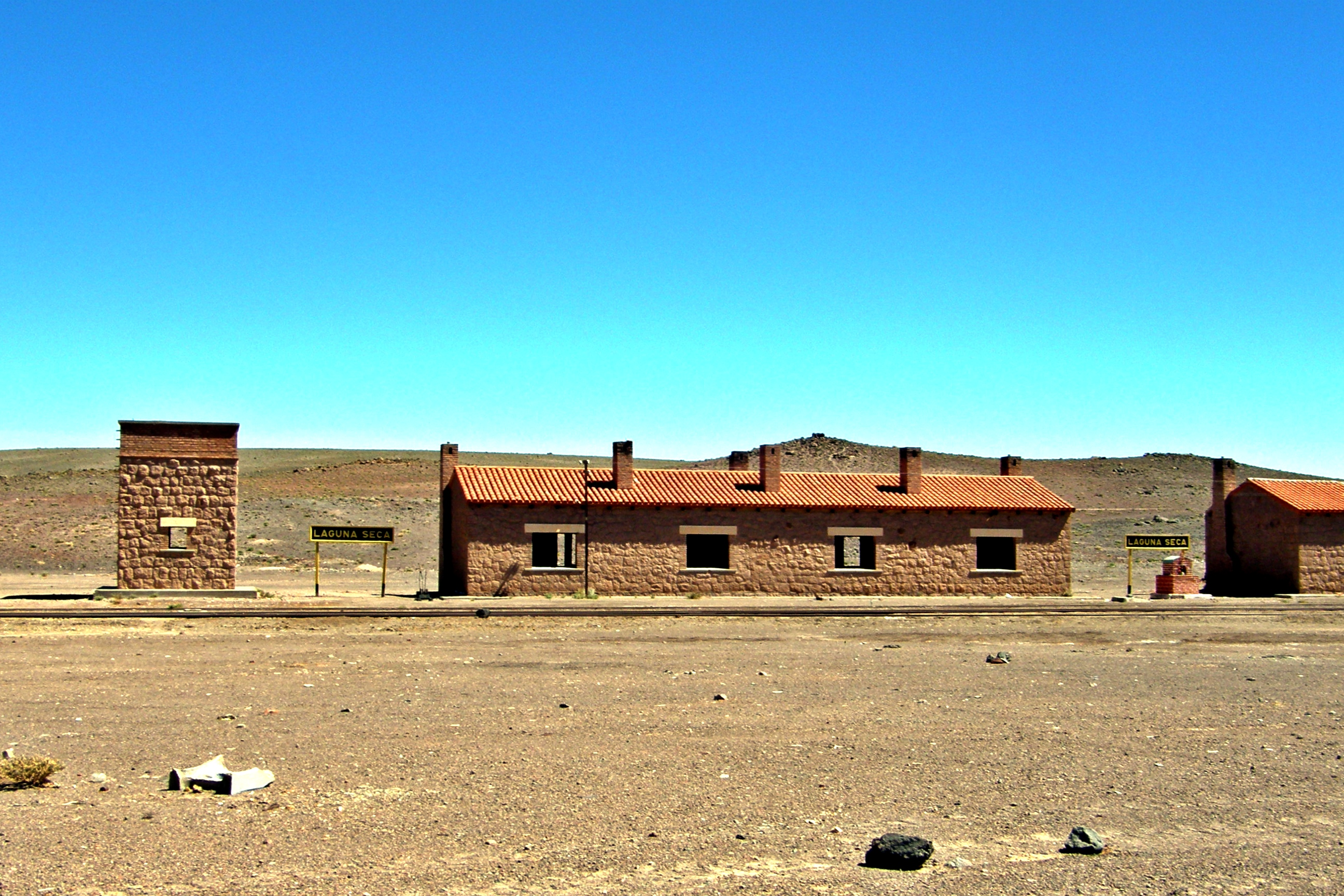
Laguna Seca station

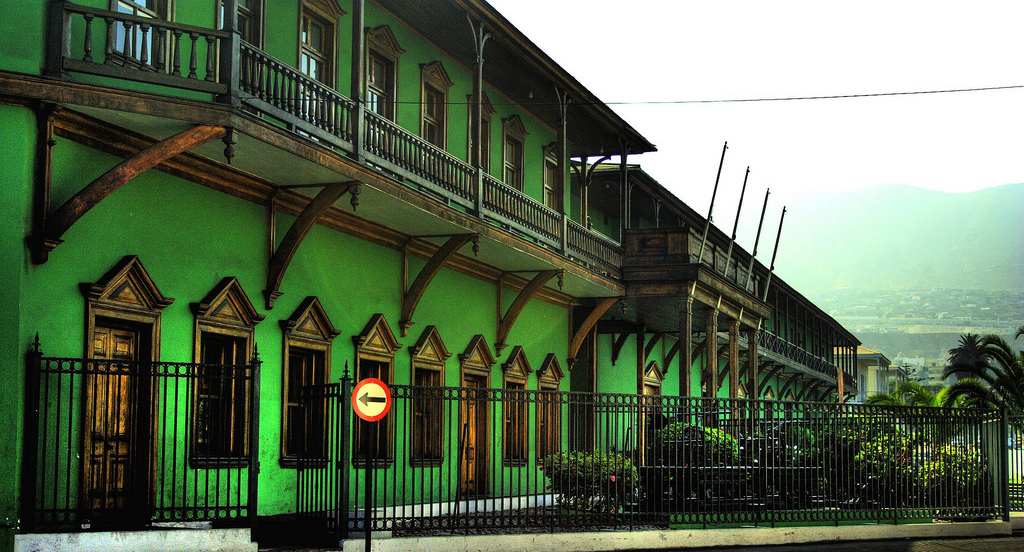
Antofagasta station building

== See also ==
- List of highest railways in the world
- South Trans-Andean Railway (Argentina–Chile): proposed line linking Zapala to Lonquimay.
- Trans-Andean railways: rail services in the Andean and atlantic countries.
- Transandine Railway (Argentina–Chile): defunct line, pending reconstruction, linking Mendoza to Santiago.
