= Campo Quijano =

- Municipality and town
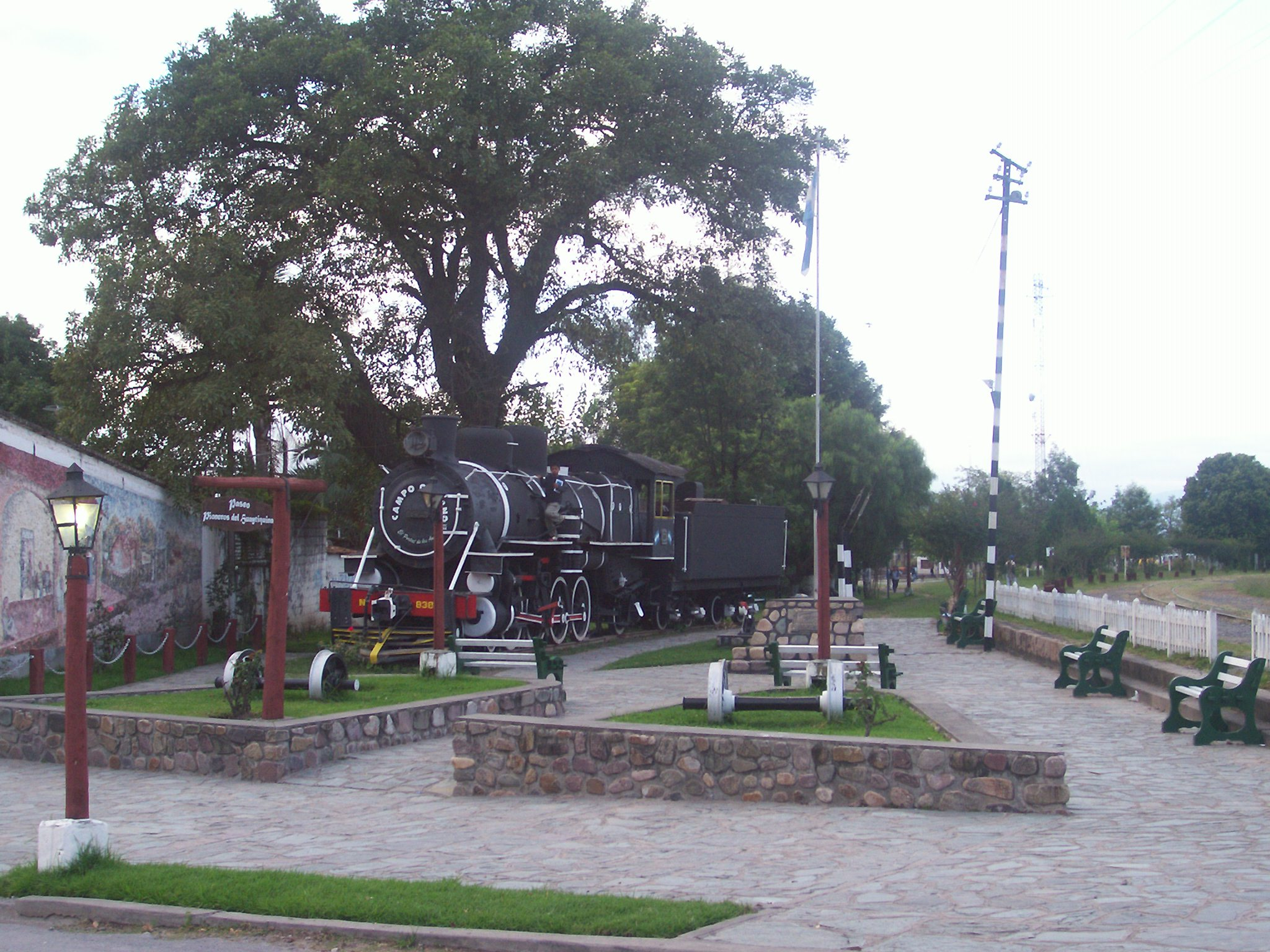
- An old steam locomotive of the Tren a las Nubes at Campo Quijano station
- Interactive map of Campo Quijano
- Country: Argentina
- Province: Salta
- Department: Rosario de Lerma
- Time zone: UTC−3 (ART)

Campo Quijano is a town and municipality in Salta Province in northwestern Argentina.

== Personalities ==
- Richard Maury (1882-1950), engineer, buried under a monument to him in the railway station
