= Santa Rosa de Tastil =

- Municipality and village
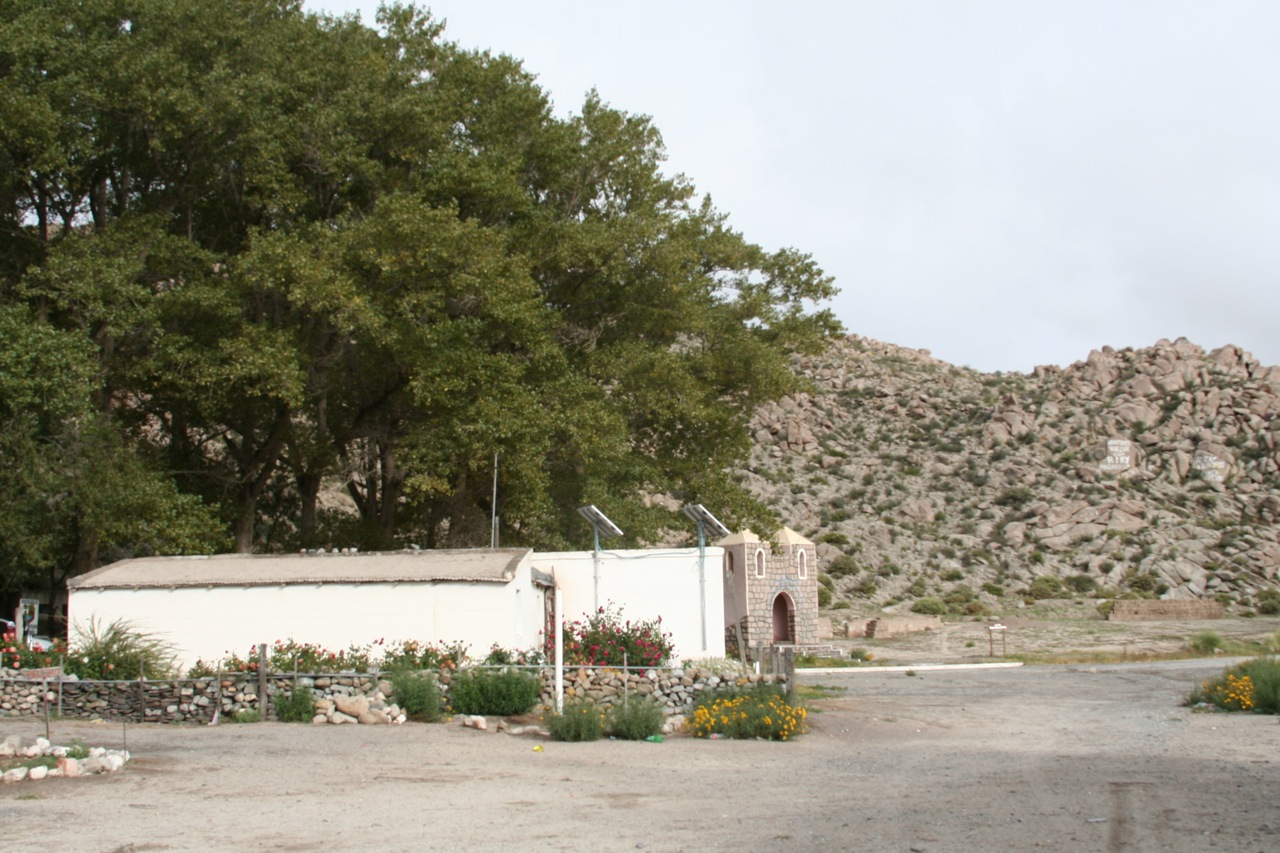

- location in Argentina
- Coordinates: 24°27′2.49″S 65°57′5.47″W
- Country: Argentina
- Province: Salta
- Department: Rosario de Lerma
- Elevation: 10,200 ft (3,110 m)

Population
  - Total: 11
- Time zone: UTC−3 (ART)
- Postal Code: A4407

Santa Rosa de Tastil is a rural municipality in Salta Province in northwestern Argentina.

== Overview ==
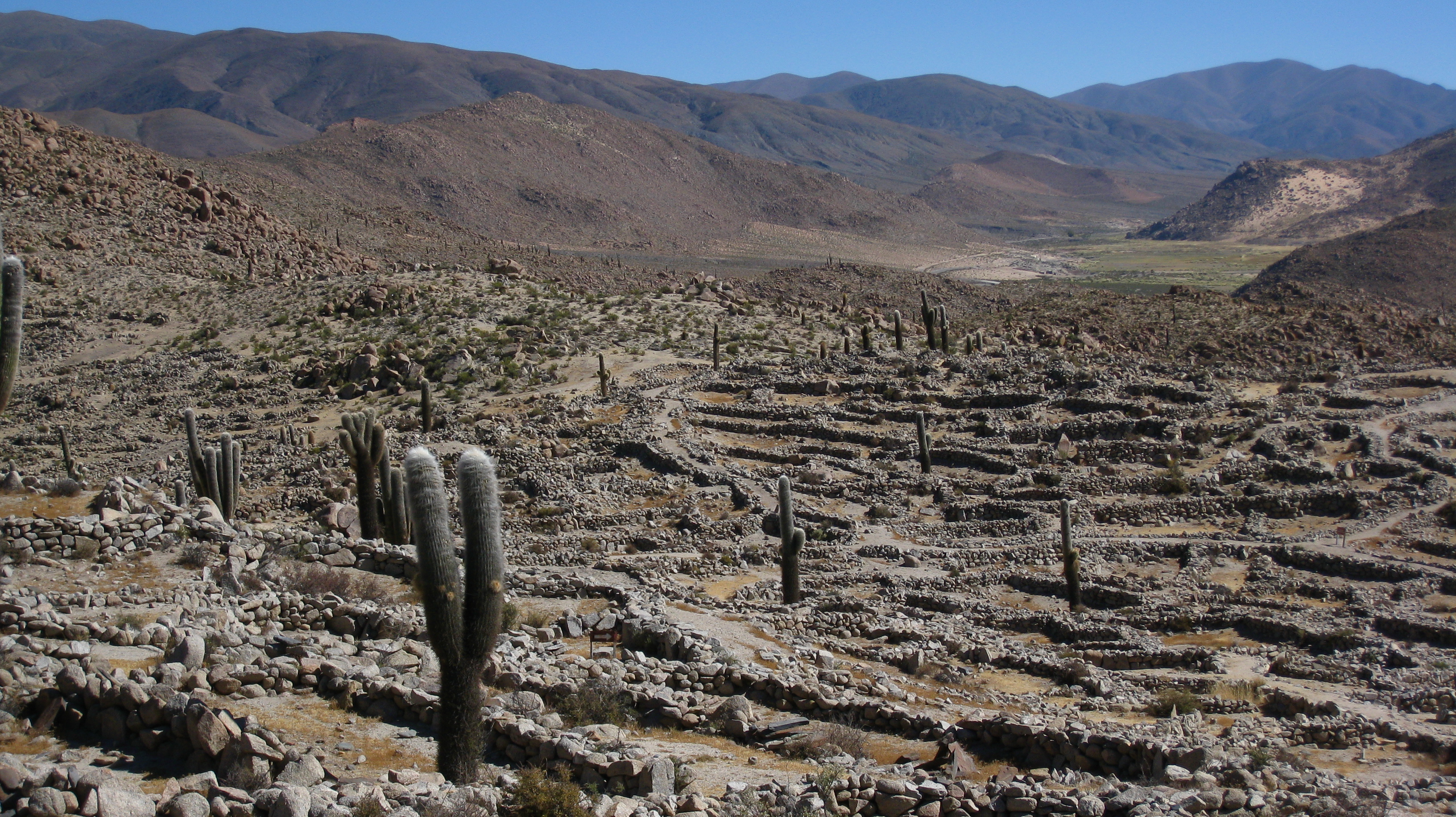
Ruins of Tastil and the Lerma Valley

It is located in the Lerma Valley, near the ruins of the ancient indigenous city of Tastil, and is populated only by eleven persons, three of which are employees of the Moisés Serpa Regional Museum of Tastil. A clinic, police station, school and church serve the small population, as well as around 150 rural inhabitants of the surrounding area. The outpost was named for Santa Rosa de Lima in 1906.

The Moisés Serpa Regional Museum of Tastil, inaugurated after the 1997 declaration of the ruins as a National Historic Monument the same year, and displays artifacts found at the site and surroundings, including a mummy dating from the 14th century. The Train to the Clouds, a heritage railway and the third-highest in the world, passes the location, and the Puerta de Tastil station is nearby.

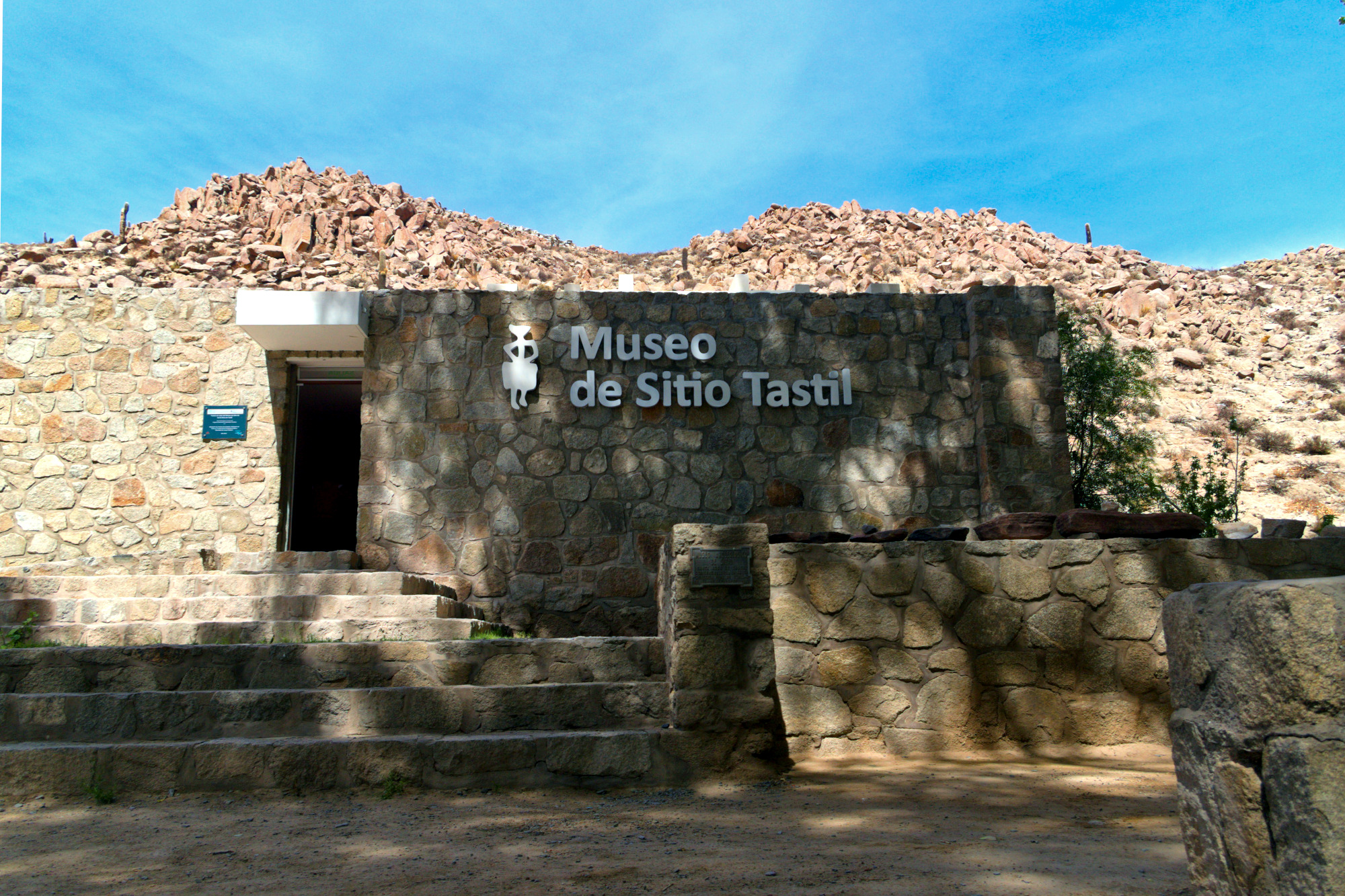
Tastil Site Museum in Santa Rosa de Tastil, Salta. At the entrance of the museum there are some sounding rocks specimens, from which the name Tastil comes from ("stone that sounds")
