= Richard Maury =

American-Argentine railway engineer

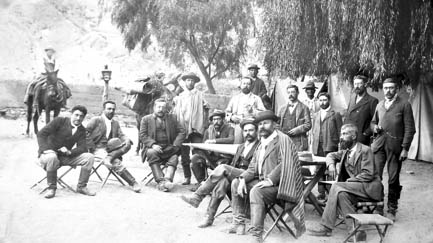
- Richard Maury (third from left) with railway workers in Salta.
- Born: Richard Fontaine Maury; December 18, 1882; Philadelphia, United States
- Died: July 10, 1950 (aged 67); Córdoba, Argentina
- Occupation: Engineer
- Years active: 1902-1950
- Spouse: Carmen Rosa Pauna
- Children: Ricardo Juan Maury
- Parent: Thompson Brooke Maury (father)

External image
- Bust of Richard Maury at Campo Quijano station (Panoramio)

Richard Fontaine Maury (Philadelphia, 18 December 1882 – Córdoba, 10 July 1950) was an American railway engineer and naturalized Argentine. He became known for the project of the Argentine "Ramal C-14" of the Ferrocarril General Manuel Belgrano and the touristic Tren a las Nubes.

== Early life ==
Richard Maury was born in Philadelphia in 1882, as the second of four brothers. He was the son of Thompson Brooke Maury. He graduated from Virginia Military Institute as an engineer in 1902. His first work was on the Pennsylvania Tunnel New York City-New Jersey.

== Career ==
In 1906 he arrived in Argentina to join in 1907 the Argentine State Railway, the national railway company of the country.

In 1921, the "Ramal C-14" Salta-Socompa, a project to build a rail line to the Chilean border was approved. Maury was appointed the head of the project. He worked there until 1931.

On July 12, 1928, he was appointed honorary professor at the National University of Tucumán, where he also published,

in 1929, he published Manual para el trazado de ferrocarriles (i.e. "Manual for the railway tracks"). He was declared the first honorary member of the Engineering Center of Tucumán in 1944.

Maury worked on the Transandine Railway from Mendoza to Las Cuevas, Argentina, on the road from Acheral to Tafi del Valle, and the railway line Yacuíba-Santa Cruz-Sucre, in Bolivia.

== Personal life ==
He married Carmen Rosa Pauna with whom he had one child, Ricardo Juan.

Richard Maury died in Córdoba in 1950 and, since 1957, his remains are buried at the foot of a monument dedicated to him in the station of Campo Quijano, a town near Salta in the Salta–Antofagasta railway. A little village and its station, part of this line and originally named "Damián M. Torino", were renamed "Ingeniero Maury" (Engineer Maury) after him.

== See also ==
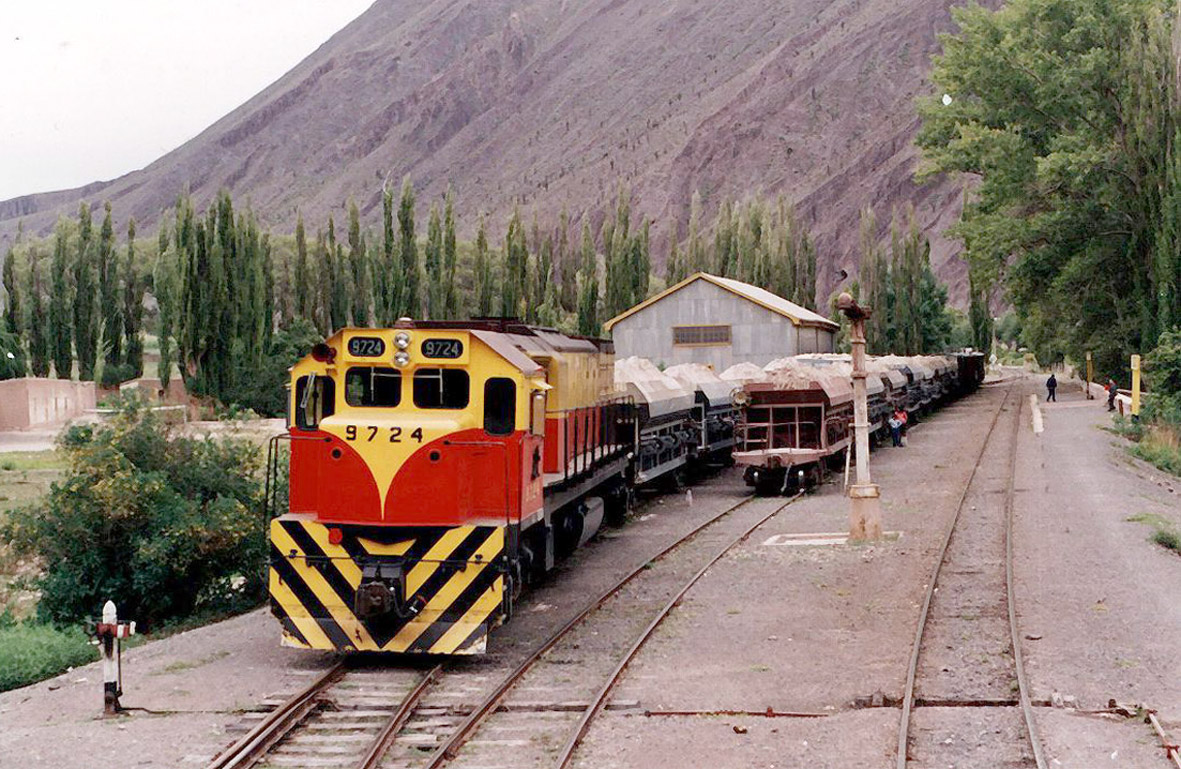
Ingeniero Maury station, served by the Tren a las Nubes (1993).

- Rail transport in Argentina
- History of Argentina
- Tren a las Nubes
- Transandine Railway
- Salta–Antofagasta railway

== Literature ==
- Richard F. Maury: "Manual para el trazado de ferrocarriles". National University of Tucumán, 1929 - 312 pages
