= San Antonio de los Cobres =

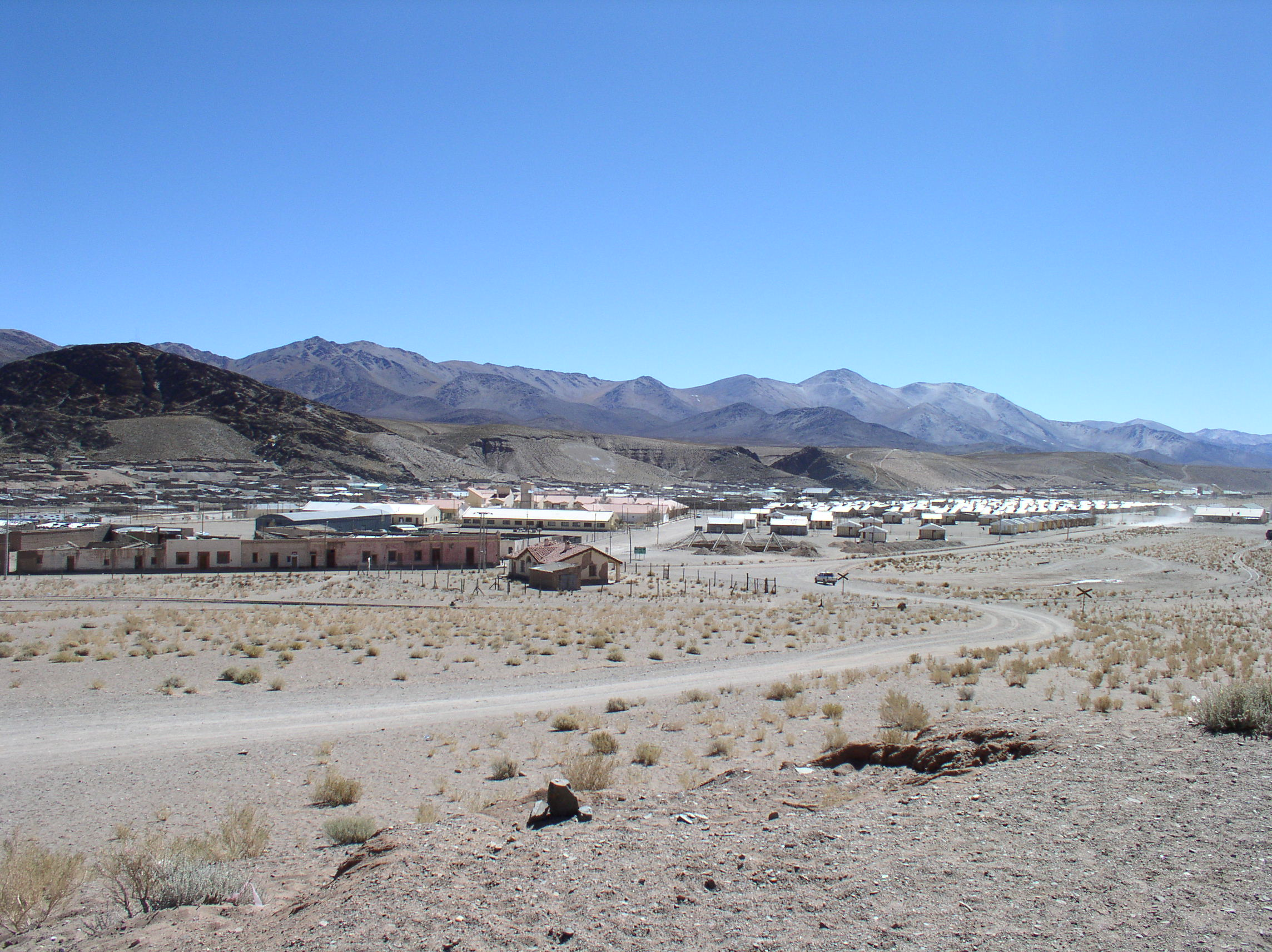
- A panoramic view of the town, as seen from the Tren de las Nubes train station

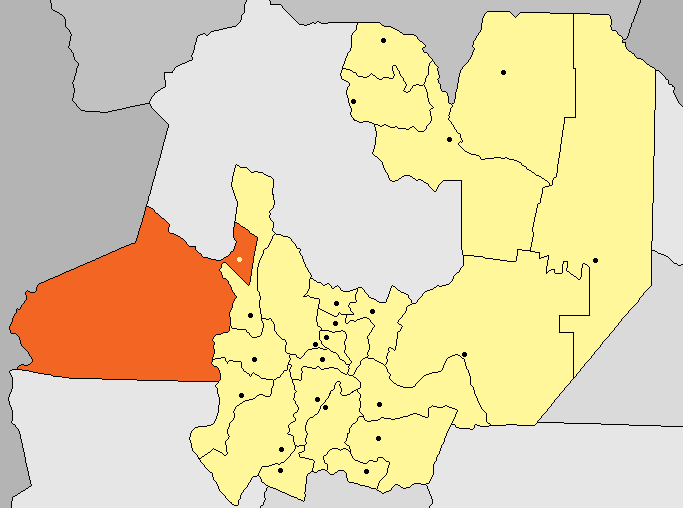
- San Antonio (yellow dot) within Los Andes Department (red) and Salta Province

- Location within Argentina
- Coordinates: 24°13′04″S 66°19′12″W
- Country: Argentina
- Province: Salta
- Department: Los Andes
- Established: ?

Government
  - Mayor: Guzmán Viveros
- Elevation: 3,775 m (12,385 ft)

Population (2001)
  - Total: 5,482
- Time zone: UTC−3 (ART)
- Postal code: A4411
- Climate: BWk
- Website: Official website

San Antonio de los Cobres is a small town of population 5,482 (per the 2001 INDEC census) in northwestern Argentina. It is the capital of the Los Andes Department of the Salta Province.

== Geography ==
The town is known for its high elevation of approximately 3,775 meters (12,385 feet) above sea level, being one of the highest elevations of any city or town in Argentina. It is located approximately 160 kilometers (99 mi) from the city of Salta and 2,000 kilometers (1,200 mi) from the capital, Buenos Aires. It is part of the Andes desert and described to be an arid region with few trees and scarce drinking water.

== History ==
San Antonio de los Cobres was established in the early 17th century, specifically in 1641. It was founded as a small settlement to support the mining activities in the region and has since developed into a key town in the high Andes of Argentina. The town's history is closely tied to its mining heritage and the Indigenous cultures of the area. In a 2015 podcast from The Naked Scientists, research has shown that people in the San Antonio de los Cobres area have remarkably developed a mutation in their genes to cope with the high levels of arsenic in the area. Having concentrations about ten times higher that those deemed safe by the World Health Organization (WHO), naturally occurring arsenic has created a very toxic environment in this region contaminating the water supplies. Evolutionary processes resulting from long term exposure have caused a specific mutation within the DNA of this population allowing them to process arsenic more quickly throughout their systems and preventing the formation of poisonous byproducts that would normally form within the body with exposure to the element. This is the first adaptation in humans regarding a toxic chemical to ever be documented.

== Economy ==
San Antonio de las Cobres takes its name from the nearby Sierra de Cobre, or Copper Mountain, which is rich in that mineral. Economic activity in the town is based on mining of the mineral-rich surrounding mountains, and weaving using local llama wool. The town is also a stop along the Tren a las Nubes (Train to the Clouds), on the Salta-Antofagasta rail line.

== Climate ==
San Antonio de los Cobres has a cool arid climate (Köppen BWk) characterised by mild summers, cold, bone-dry winters, and very large diurnal temperature variation due to the extreme altitude. Rainfall is essentially nil except from January to March, when 96 millimetres (3.78 in) of an annual total of 104 millimetres (4.09 in) falls from thunderstorms.

Climate data for San Antonio de los Cobres
Month	Jan	Feb	Mar	Apr	May	Jun	Jul	Aug	Sep	Oct	Nov	Dec	Year
Record high °C (°F)	25.4 (77.7)	25.0 (77.0)	25.0 (77.0)	21.2 (70.2)	24.5 (76.1)	18.0 (64.4)	17.3 (63.1)	18.3 (64.9)	20.0 (68.0)	23.5 (74.3)	23.2 (73.8)	27.0 (80.6)	27.0 (80.6)
Mean daily maximum °C (°F)	20.4 (68.7)	20.4 (68.7)	18.8 (65.8)	17.9 (64.2)	13.8 (56.8)	11.6 (52.9)	11.9 (53.4)	12.1 (53.8)	13.6 (56.5)	17.3 (63.1)	18.4 (65.1)	21.0 (69.8)	16.4 (61.5)
Daily mean °C (°F)	12.7 (54.9)	12.5 (54.5)	11.2 (52.2)	9.6 (49.3)	5.9 (42.6)	3.5 (38.3)	2.2 (36.0)	3.2 (37.8)	7.0 (44.6)	10.6 (51.1)	12.3 (54.1)	12.4 (54.3)	8.6 (47.5)
Mean daily minimum °C (°F)	4.2 (39.6)	2.9 (37.2)	1.4 (34.5)	−2.9 (26.8)	−5.7 (21.7)	−7.0 (19.4)	−7.7 (18.1)	−6.7 (19.9)	−4.6 (23.7)	−1.0 (30.2)	0.5 (32.9)	1.8 (35.2)	−2.1 (28.2)
Record low °C (°F)	−0.3 (31.5)	−2.0 (28.4)	−4.8 (23.4)	−8.5 (16.7)	−13.2 (8.2)	−14.5 (5.9)	−16.0 (3.2)	−13.0 (8.6)	−13.8 (7.2)	−9.2 (15.4)	−7.5 (18.5)	−3.5 (25.7)	−16.0 (3.2)
Average precipitation mm (inches)	44.0 (1.73)	32.7 (1.29)	19.4 (0.76)	0.4 (0.02)	0.2 (0.01)	0.0 (0.0)	0.0 (0.0)	1.5 (0.06)	0.6 (0.02)	0.0 (0.0)	1.1 (0.04)	4.0 (0.16)	103.9 (4.09)
Average relative humidity (%)	54	49	44	36	42	44	58	44	36	34	37	47	43.8
Source: Secretaria de Mineria

== Gallery ==
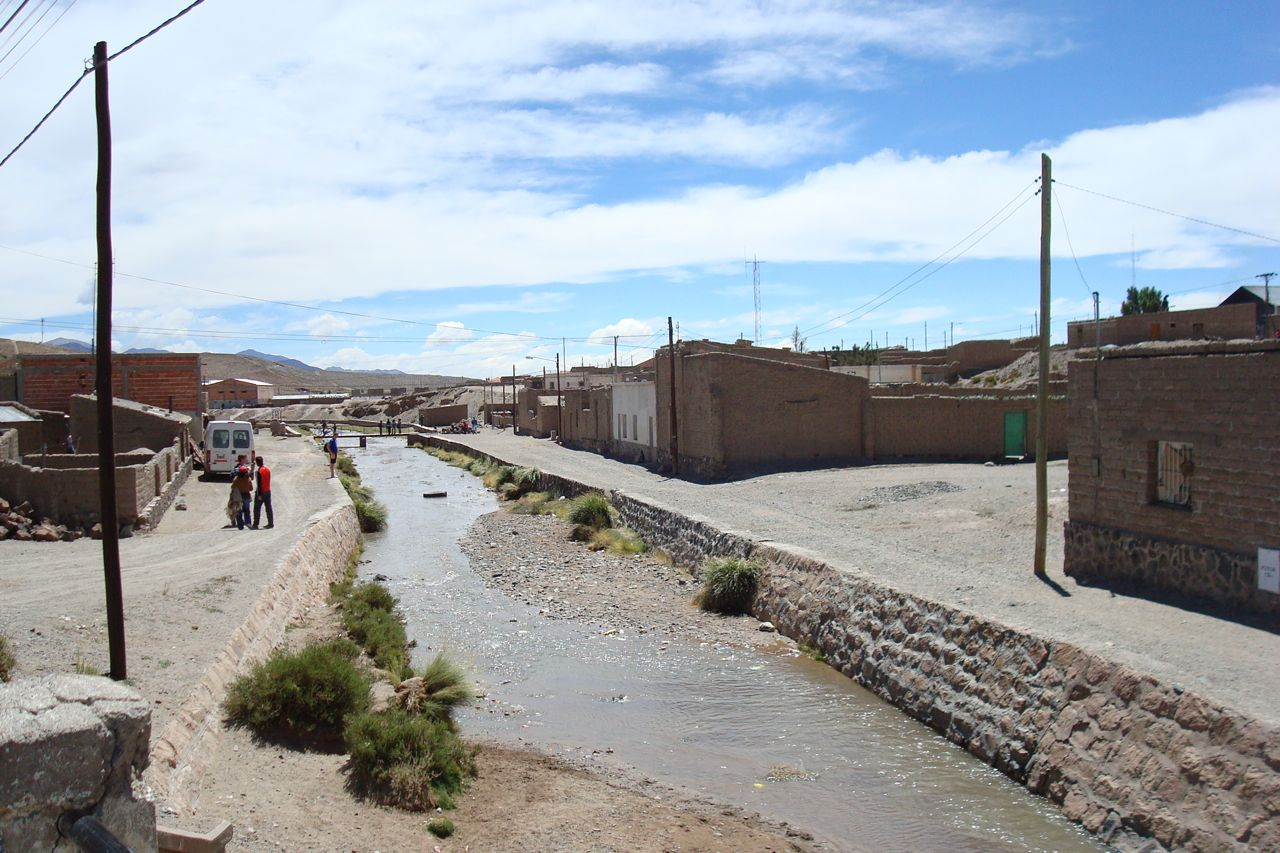
View of town center

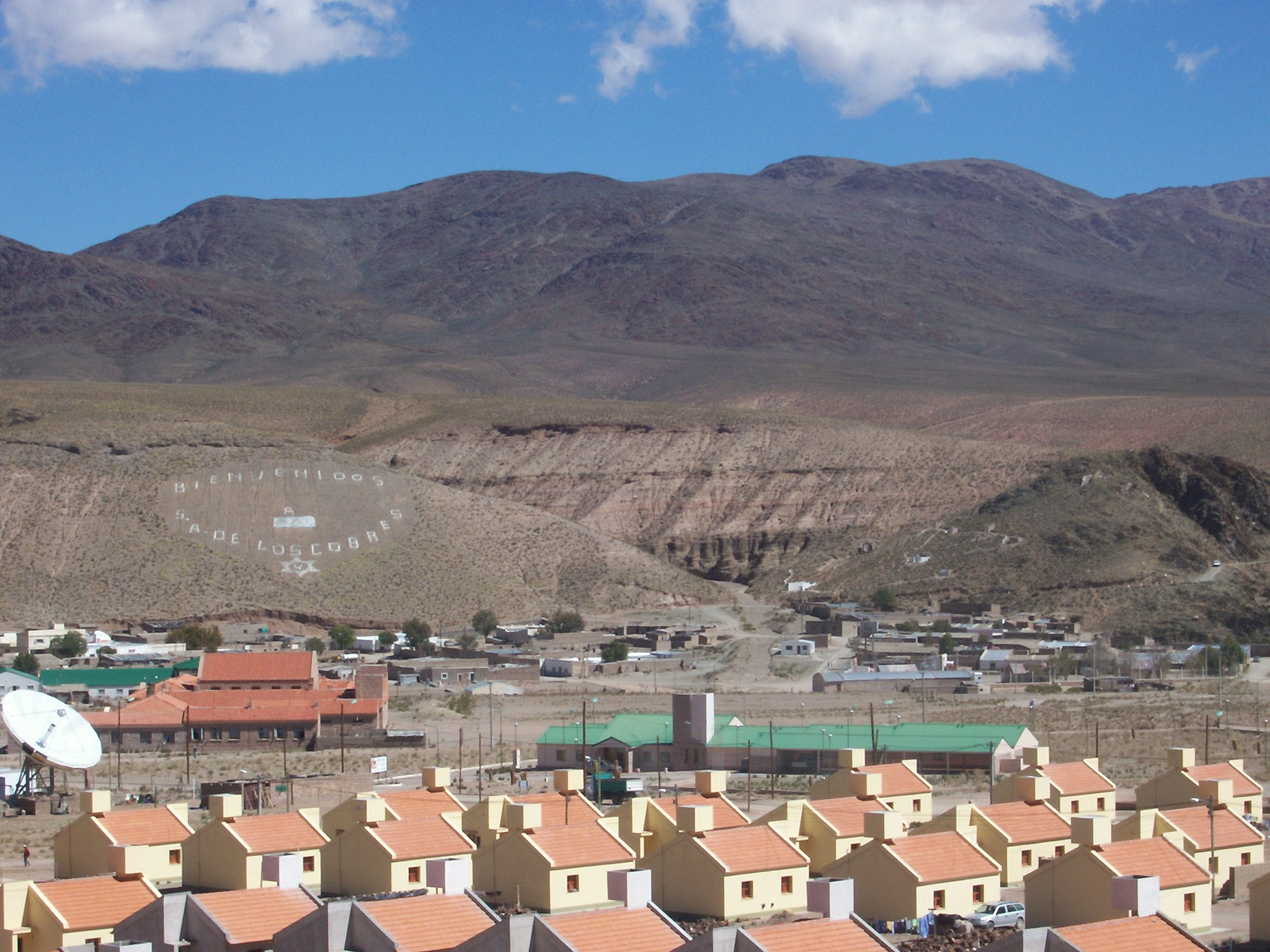
View from the road "RN51"
