= Cóndor station =

Railway station in Bolivia

Coordinates: 19°39′43″S 66°14′02″W

Cóndor railway station on the Rio Mulatos-Potosí line, Bolivia, is the highest station in the western hemisphere, at an altitude of 4,786 m (15,700 ft) above sea level. It is located in a remote, mountainous area, with little around the station area.

== Overview ==
It was the world's highest station until opening of Tanggula railway station on the Qinghai–Tibet Railway line in Tibet in 2006 at 5,072 m (16,500 ft).

== See also ==
- List of highest railway stations in the world
