= La Silleta =

Coordinates: 24°52′S 65°35′W

- Municipality and village
- Interactive map of La Silleta
- Country: Argentina
- Province: Salta Province
- Time zone: UTC−3 (ART)

La Silleta is a village and rural municipality in Salta Province in northwestern Argentina.
