= Tastil =

Coordinates: 24°27′08.14″S 65°57′25.72″W

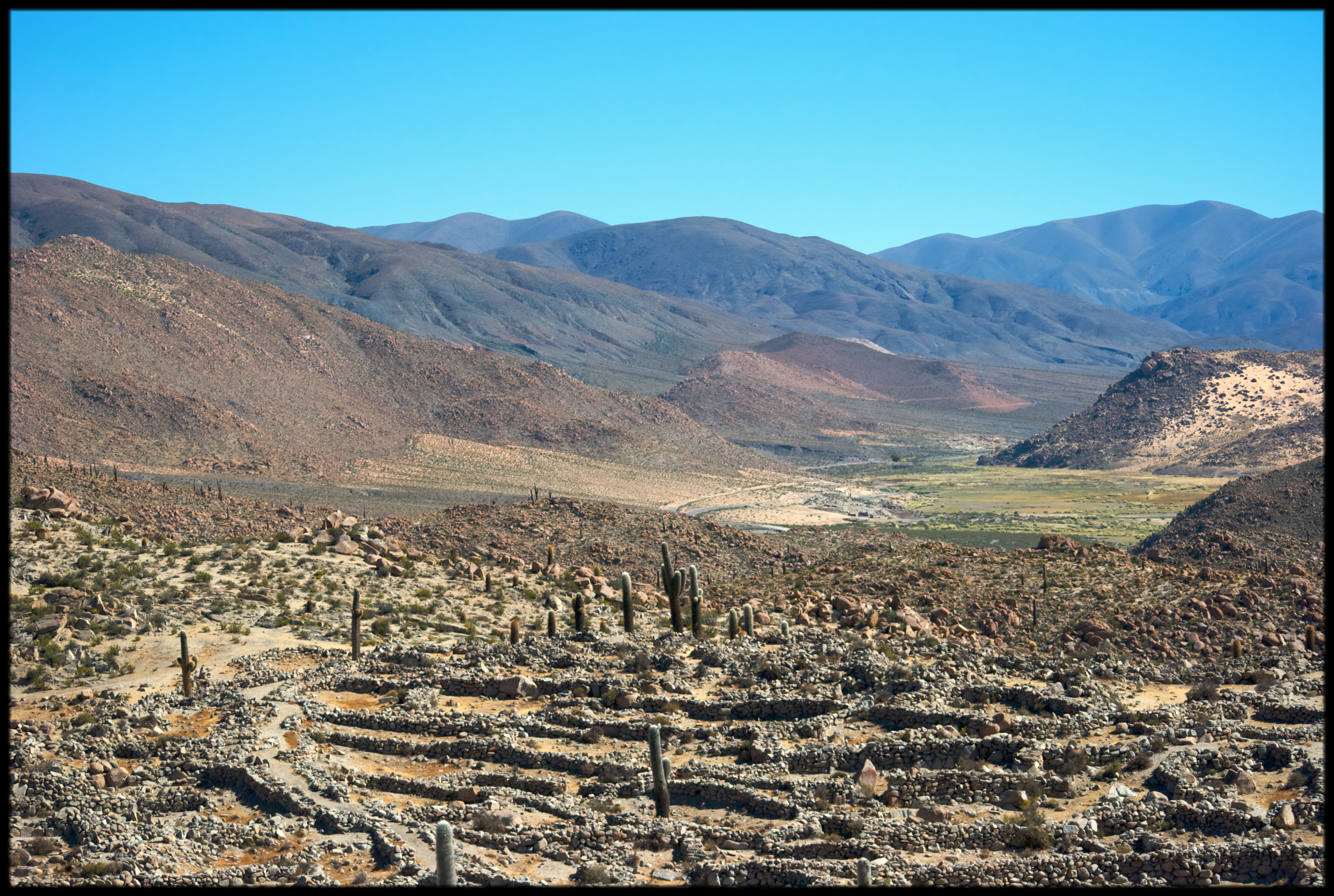
Ruins of Tastil

Tastil is an archaeological site near Santa Rosa de Tastil, Salta Province, Argentina.

== Overview ==
Located around 2.5 km (1.5 mi) northwest of the settlement are the Ruins of Tastil. Built by the Atacameño people, Tastil thrived during the 15th century, and grew to perhaps 400 households and over 2,000 inhabitants prior to a siege by the invading troops of the Inca Empire. Subsisting on quinoa, maize, and llama husbandry, the Tastileños built their community out of sandstone, and without the use of mortar. The labyrinthine layout of Tastil included catacombs and plazas, and the central square was built around a wanka (a sacred stone).

The ruins were rediscovered by Swedish anthropologist Eric Boman in 1903, and were cataloged and restored in 1967 by a team from the University of La Plata led by Dr. Mario Cicliano. Tastil was declared a National Historic Monument in 1997. The Moisés Serpa Regional Museum of Tastil, located in Santa Rosa de Tastil, was inaugurated the same year, and displays artifacts found at the site and surroundings, including a mummy dating from the 13th century.
