= Rosario de Lerma =

- City
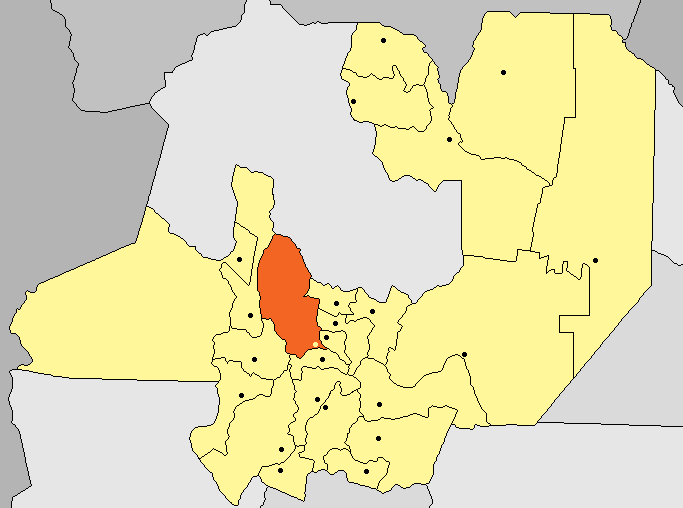
- Rosario (yellow dot) within the homonymous department (red) and Salta Province

- Location of Rosario de Lerma in Salta Province and Argentina Rosario de Lerma (Argentina)
- Coordinates: 24°59′S 65°35′W
- Country: Argentina
- Province: Salta
- Department: Rosario de Lerma

Population
  - Total: 21,592
- Time zone: UTC−3 (ART)
- CPA base: A4405
- Dialing code: +54 387
- Climate: BSk

Rosario de Lerma is a town in the center of the province of Salta, Argentina.

== Overview ==
It has 21,592 inhabitants as per the 2001 census [INDEC], and is the head town of the Rosario de Lerma Department. It lies by the Rosario River, 35 km southwest from the provincial capital Salta and northwest of the Cabra Corral Dam.
