= Rio Mulatos-Potosí line =

Railway line in Bolivia

Rio Mulatos-Potosí railway

Overview
- Locale: Bolivia
- Termini: Rio Mulatos; Potosí

History
- Opened: 1912

Technical
- Line length: 440 km (273 mi)
- Track gauge: 1,000 mm (3 ft 3 3/8 in)
- Highest elevation: 4,786 m (15,702 ft)

The Rio Mulatos-Potosí line is a railway line in Bolivia, containing Cóndor station, the Western Hemisphere's highest railway station (4,594 m or 15,072 ft). It was the world's second (after Ticlio, in Peru) until the completion of the Tanggula railway station on the Qinghai–Tibet Railway (5,072 m or 16,640 ft) in the Tanggula Mountains, Tibet.

== See also ==
- Rail transport in Bolivia
