= Tren a las Nubes =

Tourist train service in Argentina

Coordinates: 24.7769°S 65.4114°W

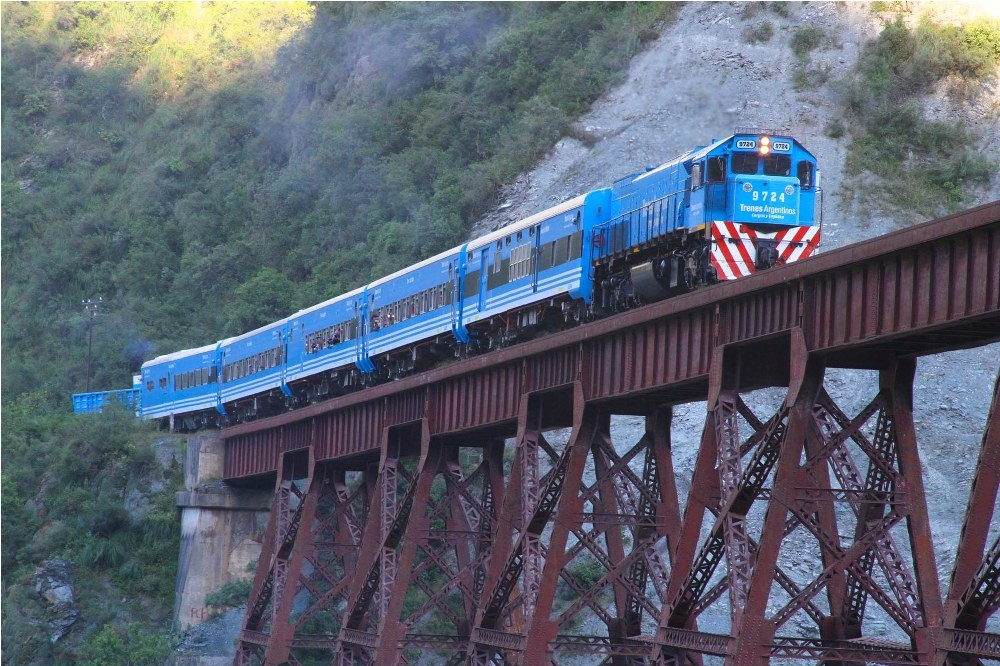
- The train during the first trip after its reopening, April 2015

Overview
- Service type: Heritage
- Status: Active
- Locale: Salta Province
- First service: 1948; 77 years ago
- Current operator: Servicio Ferroviario Turístico Sociedad del Estado (Salta)
- Former operators: Ferrocarriles Argentinos (1948–1991); Private companies (1991–2014); Sociedad del Estado SFTSE (2014–present)
- Website: trenalasnubes.com.ar

Route
- Termini: San Antonio de los Cobres; La Polvorilla Viaduct
- Stops: 20
- Distance travelled: 217 kilometres (130 mi)
- Average journey time: 8 hours (including rest stops)
- Service frequency: Four times a week
- Line used: General Belgrano Railway C-14 branch

On-board services
- Catering facilities: Yes

Technical
- Track gauge: 1,000 mm (3 ft 3 3/8 in) metre gauge
- Track owner: Government of Argentina
Route map
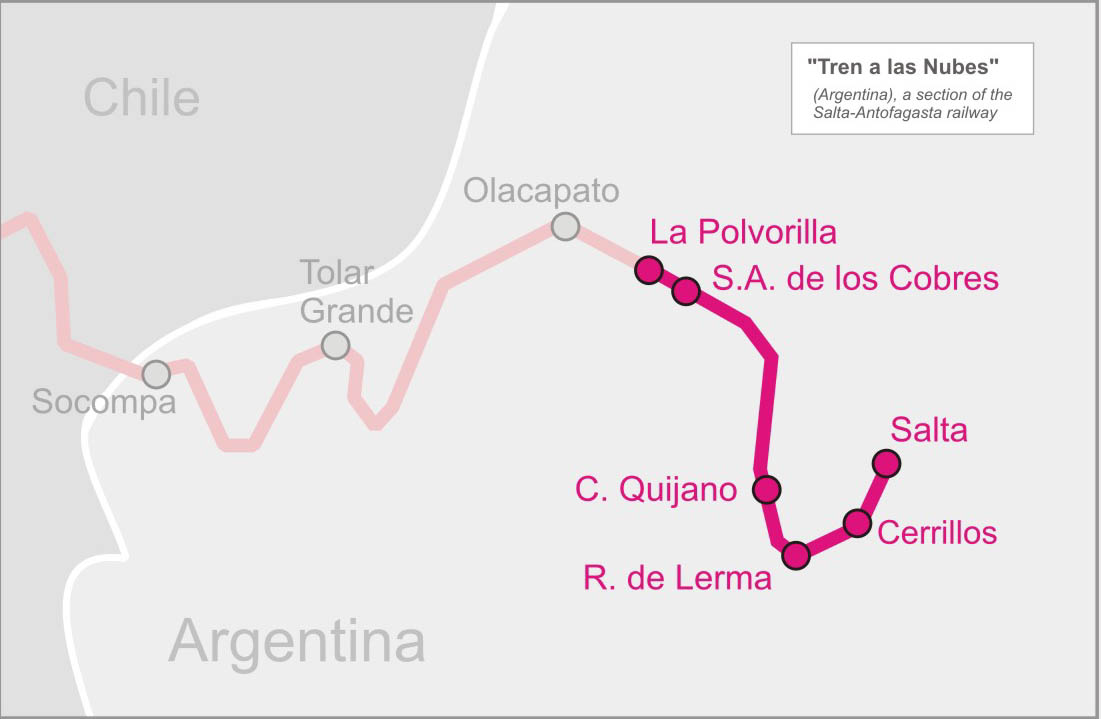

The Tren a las Nubes (English: Train to the Clouds) is a tourist train service in Salta Province, Argentina. The service runs along the eastern part of the Salta–Antofagasta railway line of the Belgrano Railway (also known as the "C-14" line) that connects the Argentine Northwest with the border in the Andes mountain range, over 4,220 metres (13,850 ft) above mean sea level, the fifth highest railway in the world. Originally built for economic and social reasons, it is now primarily of interest to tourists as a heritage railway, though cheaper tickets are also available for locals to use the train as transport.

== Overview ==
The railway line has 29 bridges, 21 tunnels, 13 viaducts, 2 spirals and 2 zigzags. Because of the design decision not to use a rack-and-pinion for traction, the route had to be designed to avoid steep grades. The zigzags allow the train to climb up driving back and forth parallel to the slope of the mountain.

The train runs four days a week, departing from San Antonio de los Cobres (where passengers arrive from Salta by bus) to La Polvorilla viaduct. though most tourists simply do the 8-hour one-way trip and return by other means. The train is composed of a dining carriage, bar carriage, a first aid area and two passenger carriages with room for 170 people, though this is expected to increase to 400 over time.

Currently, the train leaves San Antonio station for the 13-hour, 434-kilometre (270 mi) round trip to the Polvorilla viaduct, located 4,220 m (13,850 ft) above sea level. The curved viaduct is 224 m (735 ft) long and 64 m (210 ft) high. Once the train has left Salta, it first enters the Valle de Lerma, and then the Quebrada del Toro, before reaching the puna. There are numerous stops along the way, some with markets selling artisan goods and locals offering regional cuisine.

== History ==
=== Beginning ===
The possibility of a railway in the area began to be explored as early as 1889, and numerous studies were carried out up until 1916 analysing the feasibility of the line given the steep gradients and harsh terrain. Construction of the railway officially started in 1921, with the intention of connecting the North of Argentina with Chile across the Andes. The La Polvorilla viaduct, the highest of the line, was finished on 7 November 1932.

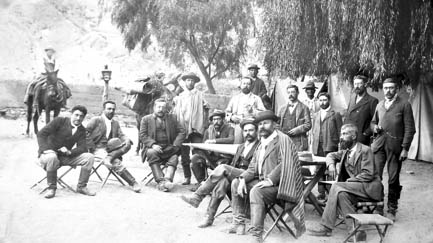
Richard Maury (third from the left) with railway workers, c. 1920s

The route was designed by American engineer Richard Maury, (who later died in Salta) and after whom one of the stations has been named. The complete railway was inaugurated on 20 February 1948, following numerous delays and complications and a two-year period where work was stopped.

The line got its name in the early 1960s after students filmed a trip on the Salta-Antofagasta railway from inside the train carriages, often showing the vapor from the then-steam locomotive which – together with the cold mountain air – formed large vapour plumes. The footage was later offered to the Clarín newspaper to make a documentary, which was subsequently called Tren a las Nubes ("Train to the Clouds") because of the vapour clouds in the film. Ferrocarriles Argentinos (FA) later adopted the name to make it more appealing to tourists. It was not until 1972 that the route began being officially used by tourists as a heritage railway.

=== Privatisation ===
State-owned company Ferrocarriles Argentinos operated the service until early 1990s when the privatization process carried out by Carlos Menem's administration granted Tren de las Nubes in concession to a private local operator that took over the line in 1991.

In 2005 a train stopped at a 3,500 m (11,500 ft) height, with passengers having to be evacuated using helicopters. Since then, the National and Provincial Governments rebuilt the line, replacing 60 km (37 mi) of tracks and granting a new concession to private company "Ecotren" to operate the Tren a las Nubes. The train was again opened to the public on 6 August 2008,

=== Renationalisation ===
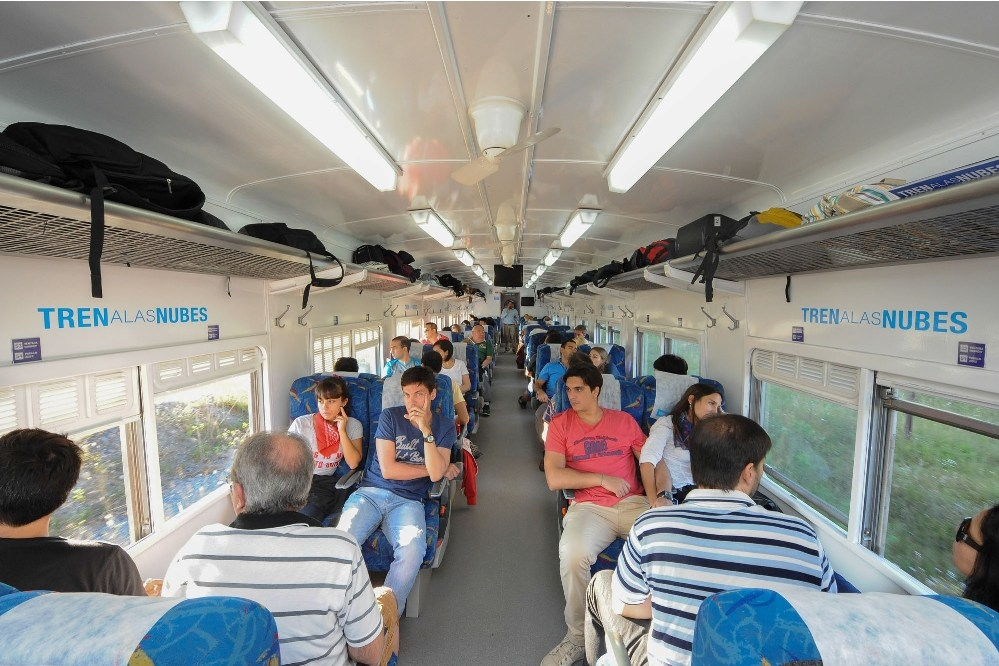
Interior of a carriage post-renationalisation

In July 2014 a train derailed near Abra Muñano, at a 4,000 m (13,000 ft) height, 80 km (50 mi). before reaching San Antonio de los Cobres. About 400 passengers had to be evacuated from the train. After the incident, the Government of Salta led by Juan Manuel Urtubey rescinded the contract with "Ecotren", alleging safety failures. Following these events, the service was re-nationalised and the Province took over the operation and maintenance of the service. through a recently created state-owned company, "Sociedad del Estado Tren a las Nubes SFTSE".

With the Government of Salta as operator of the service, the Tren a las Nubes was announced to be running again by March 2015, although the service did not begin running again until 4 April 2015. During the 8-month closure of the line, both the National Government and the government of Salta had restored much of the railway track as well as the rolling stock. For that refurbishing, coaches were remodeled by the Province along with freight transport company Belgrano Cargas, while diesel locomotives were repaired at Alta Córdoba workshops.

As of November 2025, only the 44km portion between San Antonio de los Cobres and La Polvorilla viaduct is covered by train, with passengers being brought from Salta and back by bus.

== Gallery ==
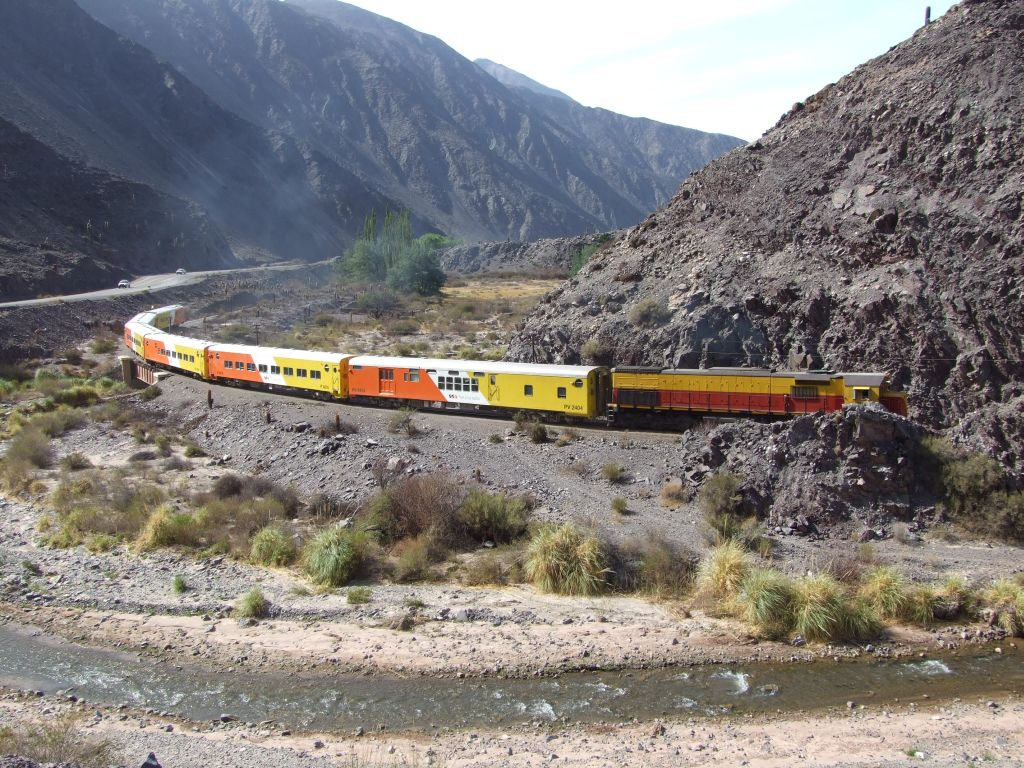
Curve in Salta

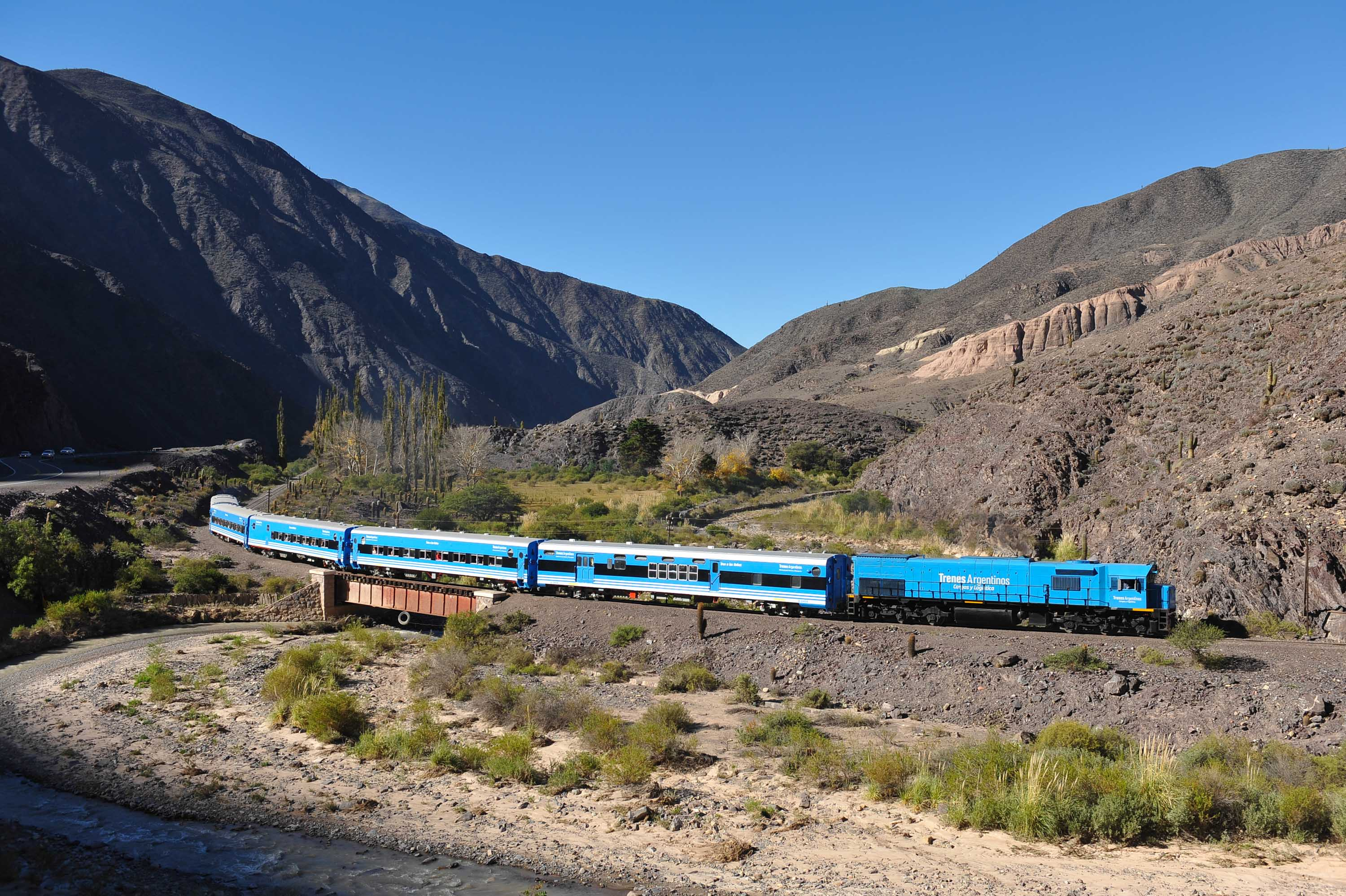
Crossing railway bridge

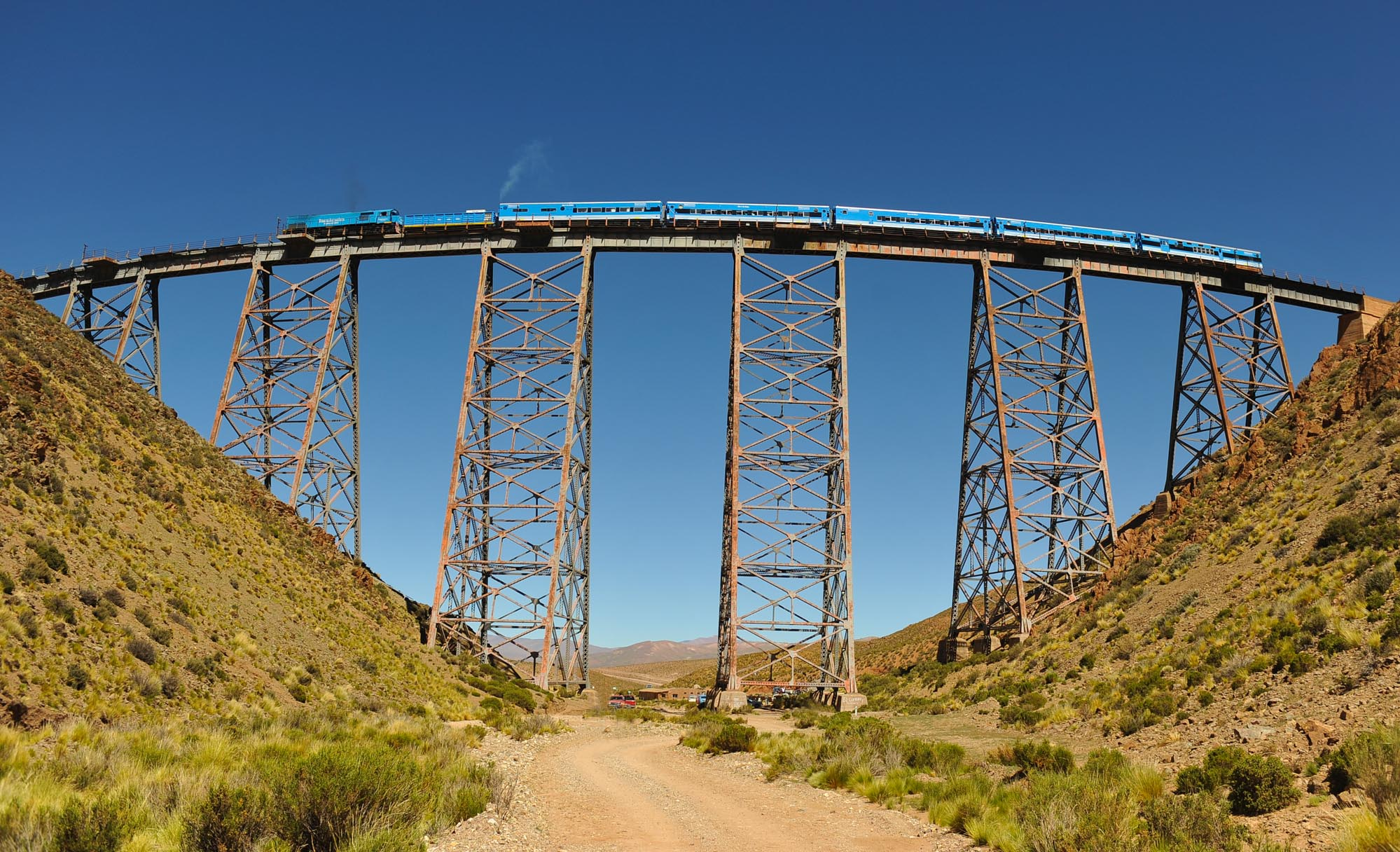
The train crossing one of 13 viaducts

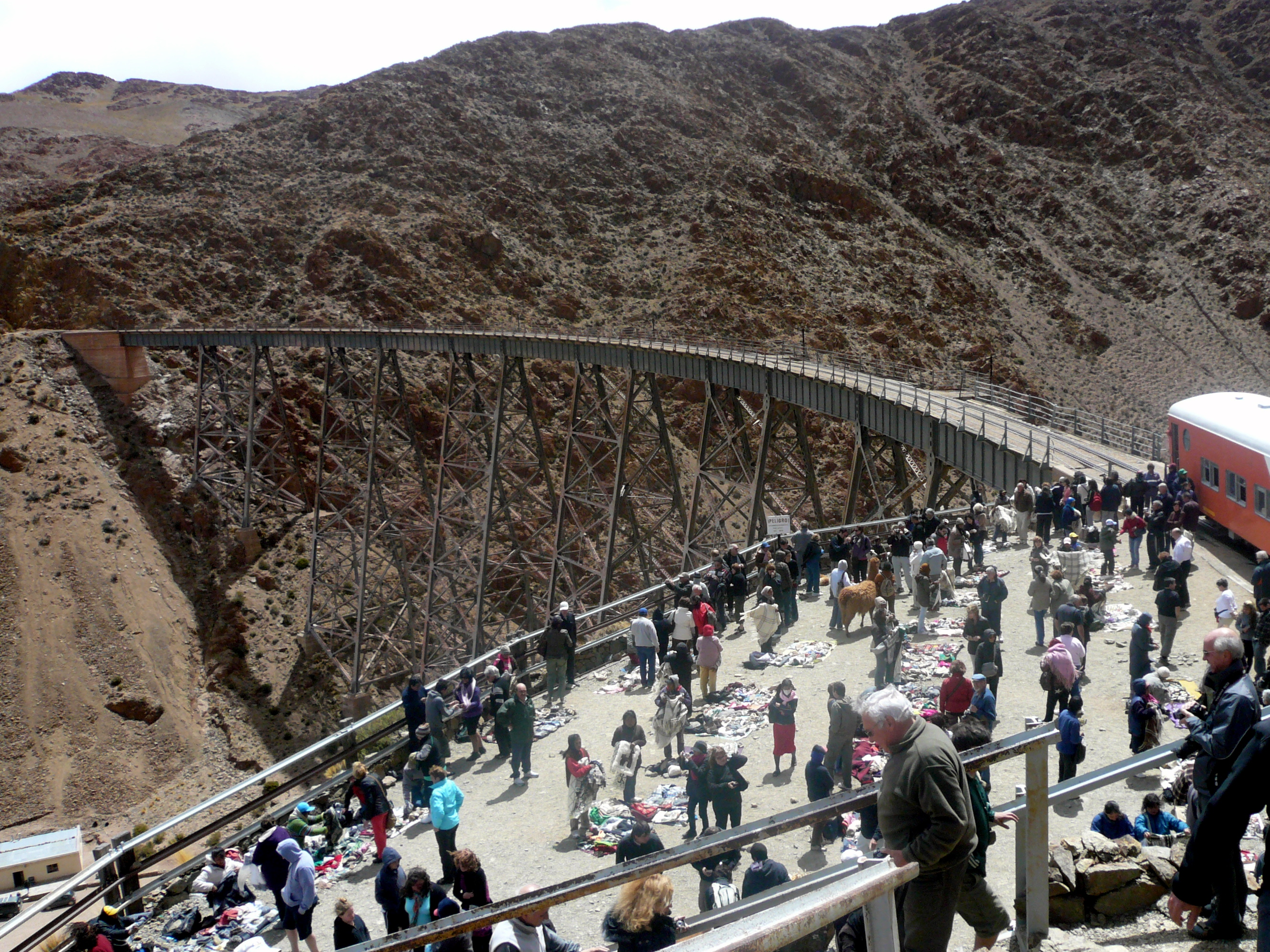
La Polvorilla viaduct with an artisan market

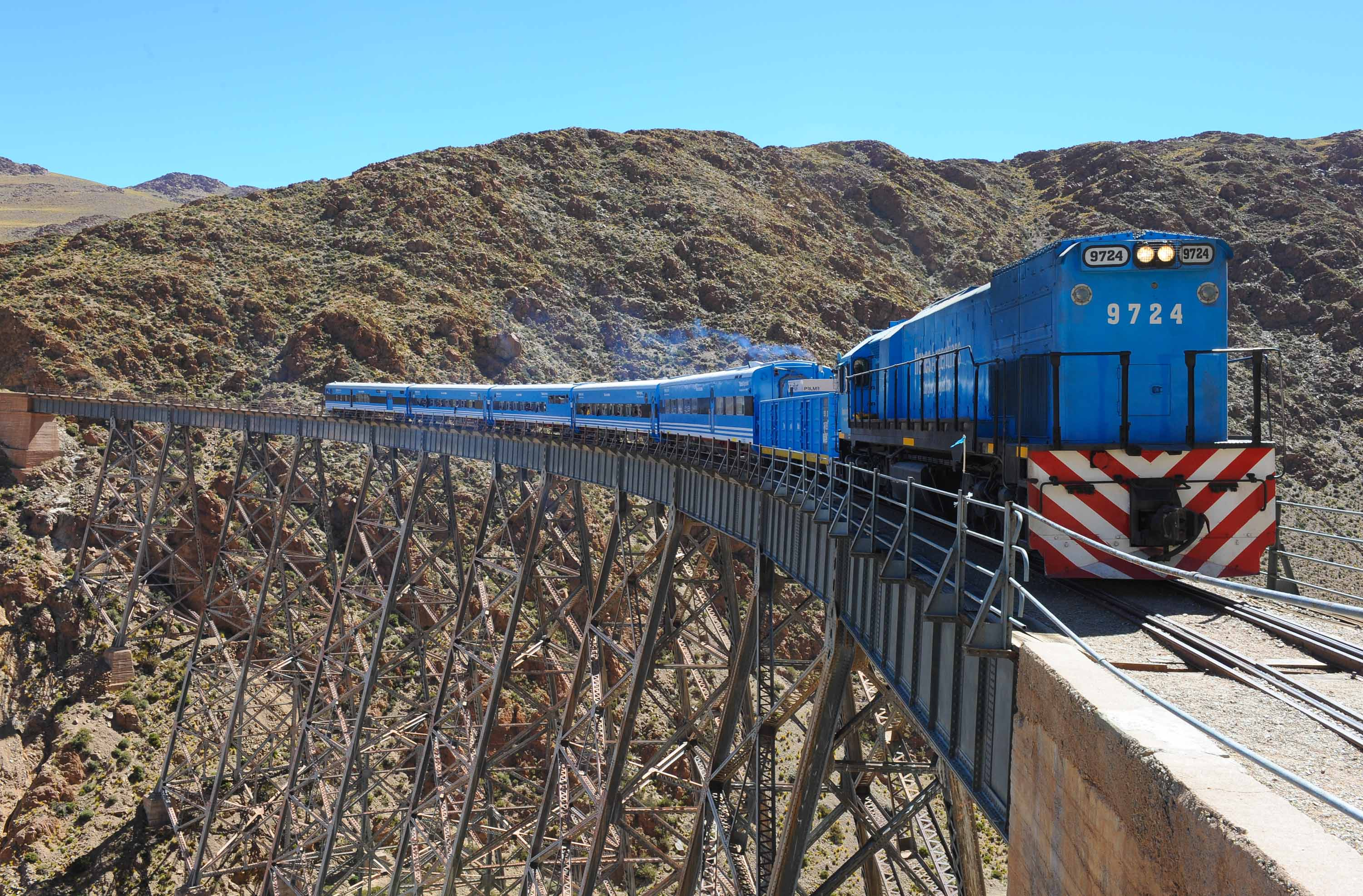
Crossing a viaduct in 2015

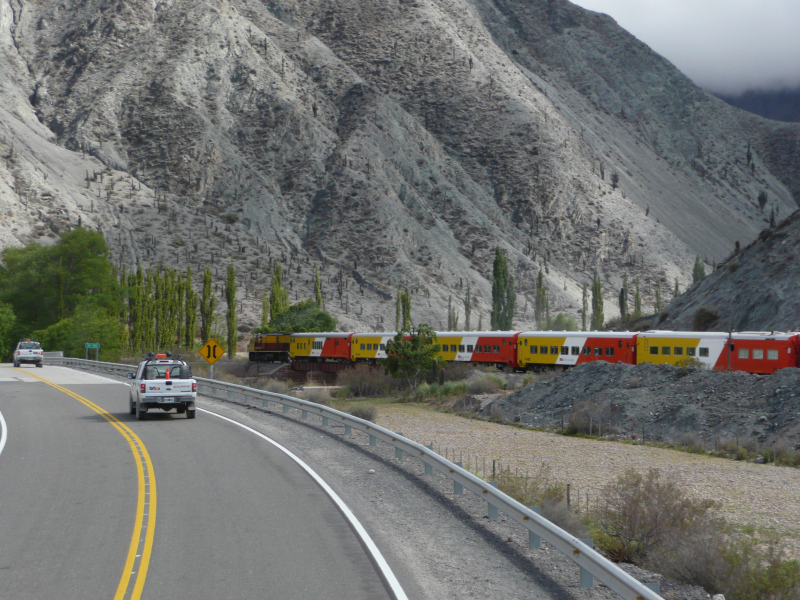
Train parallel to National Route 40

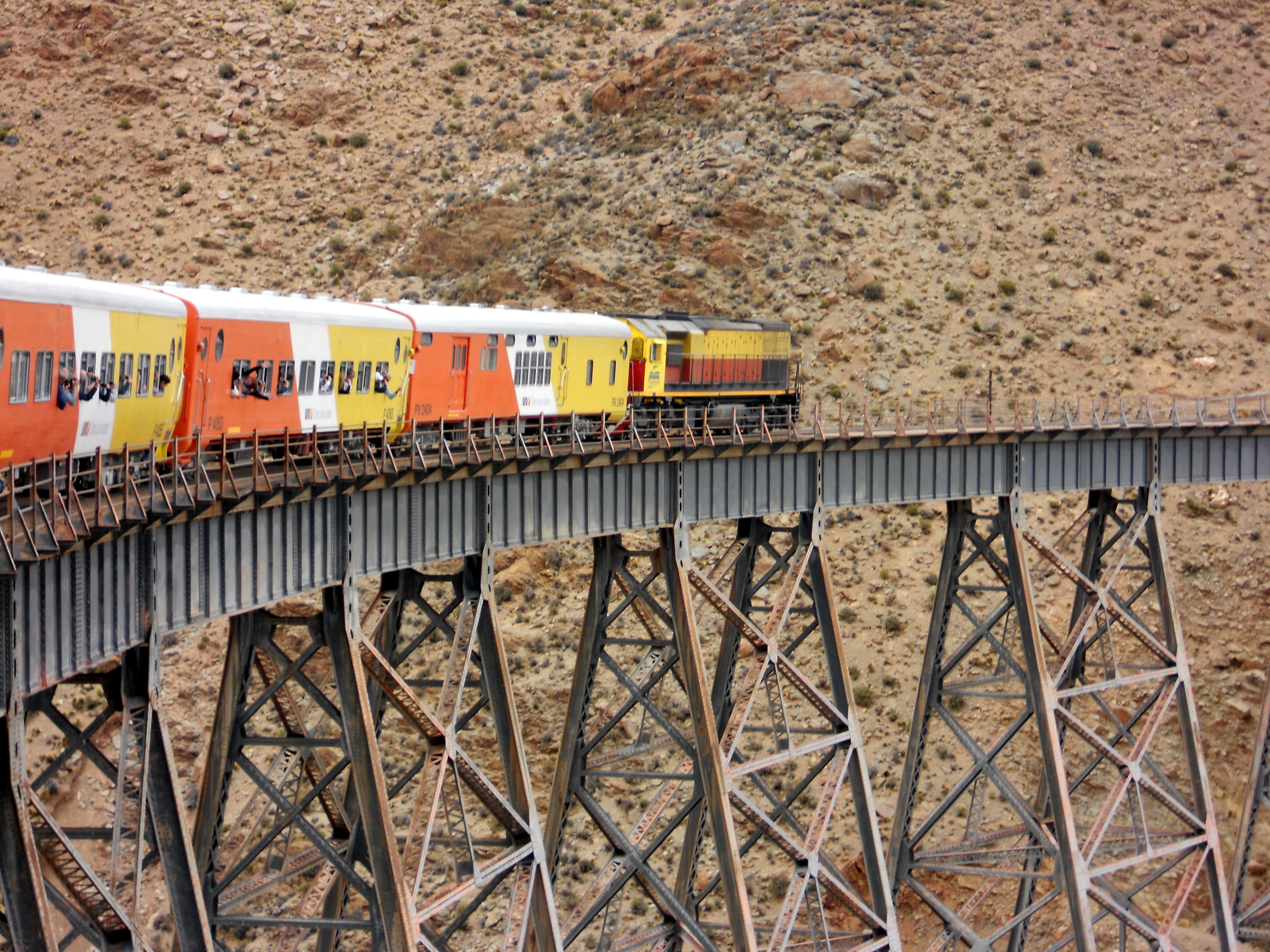
Crossing La Polvorilla

== See also ==
- List of heritage railways
