= List of bridges in Bolivia =

This is a list of bridges and viaducts in Bolivia, including those for pedestrians and vehicular traffic.

== Historical and architectural interest bridges ==
	Name	Distinction	Length	Type	Carries Crosses	Opened	Location	Department	Ref.
1	Méndez Bridge		208 m (682 ft)	Suspension; Wooden deck, masonry towers	Pilcomayo River	19th century	Sucre–Betanzos; 19°21′19.3″S 65°10′38.7″W	Chuquisaca Department; Potosí Department	(Note: Also called Puente Arce, Puente colgante Antonio José de Sucre or Puente Sucre)
2	Horacio Guzmán International Bridge	Argentina–Bolivia border	31 m (102 ft)		La Quiaca River	1960	Villazón–La Quiaca; 22°05′47.5″S 65°35′46.4″W	Potosí Department; Argentina	
3	Wilson Pinheiro Binational Bridge	Bolivia–Brazil border		Cable-stayed; Composite steel/concrete deck, 1 concrete pylon 77+42	Road bridge Acre River	2004	Cobija–Brasiléia; 11°00′58.0″S 68°45′05.5″W	Pando Department; Brazil	

== Major road and railway bridges ==
This table presents the structures with the greater spans (non-exhaustive list).

	Name	Span	Length	Type	Carries Crosses	Opened	Location	Department	Ref.
1	Fisculco Bridge	140 m (460 ft)	322 m (1,056 ft)	Box girder Prestressed concrete	Route 6	2018	Sucre–Ravelo; 18°55′00.5″S 65°25′29.4″W	Potosí Department	(Note: Highest bridge in Bolivia (123 m (404 ft) high deck).)
2	Santa Rosa Bridge	130 m (430 ft)		Cable-stayed; Concrete deck, concrete pylons	Route 38; Río Grande (Bolivia)	1994	Pucará; 18°43′19.3″S 64°18′58.9″W	Chuquisaca Department; Santa Cruz Department	
3	The Triplets bridges Kantutani Bridge	113 m (371 ft)	233 m (764 ft)	Extradosed; Concrete box girder deck, concrete pylons 53+113+67	Road bridge Avenida Kantutani	2010	La Paz; 16°31′00.0″S 68°07′12.3″W	La Paz Department	
4	Bridge of the Americas	110 m (360 ft)		Cable-stayed; Concrete deck, concrete pylons	Road bridge Avenida del Poeta	1993	La Paz; 16°30′27.5″S 68°07′22.8″W	La Paz Department	
5	The Triplets bridges Orkojahuira Bridge	103 m (338 ft)	219 m (719 ft)	Extradosed; Concrete box girder deck, concrete pylons 50+103+65	Road bridge Avenida René Zavaleta	2010	La Paz; 16°30′54.2″S 68°06′56.3″W	La Paz Department	
6	The Triplets bridges Choqueyapu Bridge	92 m (302 ft)	191 m (627 ft)	Extradosed; Concrete box girder deck, concrete pylons 52+95+46	Road bridge Choqueyapu River; Avenida del Libertador	2010	La Paz; 16°30′58.0″S 68°07′02.9″W	La Paz Department	
7	Alto Beni River Bridge		616 m (2,021 ft)	Box girder Prestressed concrete	Route 3 Rio La Paz		Sapecho; 15°33′31.2″S 67°22′29.0″W	La Paz Department	

== See also ==
- Transport in Bolivia
- List of national roads in Bolivia
- Rail transport in Bolivia
- Geography of Bolivia
- List of rivers of Bolivia

== Notes and references ==
- Notes
- Nicolas Janberg. "International Database for Civil and Structural Engineering". Structurae.com.
- Others references
