= History of rail transport in Bolivia =

This article is part of the history of rail transport by country series

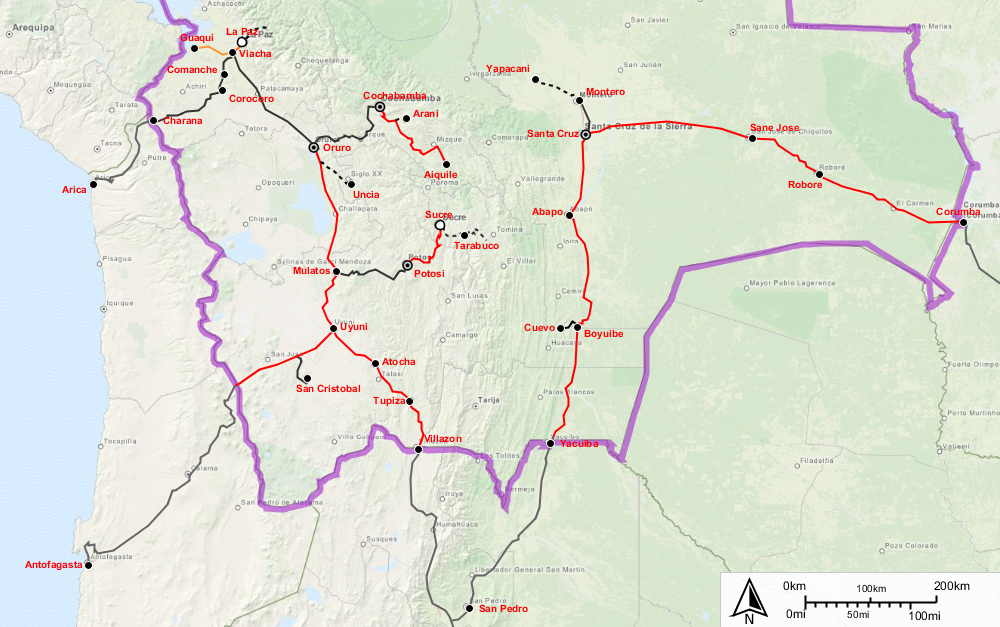
Interactive map of the Bolivian rail network (2014)

The history of rail transport in Bolivia began in the 1870s after almost three decades of failed efforts to build railroads to integrate the country, mining was the driving force for the construction of railways. The need to transport saltpeter to the coast triggered the first railway lines in Bolivia. It was the silver mining, however, that drove the construction of a railway from the Pacific coast to the high plateau during the nineteenth century. Later, at the beginning of the twentieth century, tin mining gave a new impetus to railway building, forming what is now known as the Andean or Western network. The eastern network, on the other hand, developed between the years 1940 and 1960 and is financed in exchange for oil through agreements with Argentina and Brazil. Bolivia being a landlocked country, the railways played a fundamental role and the history of its railroads is the history of the country's efforts to reach first ports on the Pacific coast and then the Atlantic.

Five phases can be distinguished in the history of the railways of Bolivia:

- 1870–1900: Silver mining companies built their own railways for ore transport.
- 1900 and 1930: The greatest expansion, financed by foreign investment. In this period connections were made with Peru and Argentina, as well as between the Bolivia's main cities of the high plateau and valleys forming the Western network.
- 1930–1964: Increasingly independent operations by foreign railway companies, mining companies and state railways. After 1940, government policy gave priority to the roads over railways. Nevertheless, railways are constructed to Argentina and Brazil creating Eastern network.
- 1964–1966: Nationalization of the railways, the creation of the National State Railways Company (ENFE) in 1964 with a policy role in the development of the country.
- 1997–2013: The privatization of the railways through the capitalization process.

== Origin ==
The origins of Bolivia's railways go back to the 1840s, when the need to transport higher volumes of saltpeter began to be a problem for the future development of nitrate exploitation. Some examples of the first failed efforts in 1856 were the call for a tender to build the Cobija–Calama railroad by President Córdova and the agreement between Peru and Bolivia to unite Tacna and La Paz with the "camino lane". In 1867, it was agreed to construct the Cobija–Aduana Nacional railway, a year later the construction of a Cobija–Potosí railroad was approved, and in 1869 authorization was given for the construction of the La Paz–Aigachi railway. However, none were successful. For a complete list of railway projects and the legislation that was approved to carry them out see. On the other hand, the introduction of railways, also known as "railway of mines", to facilitate the transportation of ore in wagons to the interior and exterior of the mine first worked in Karwayqullu (Quijarro, Potosí) from 1853.

== First phase (1870–1899) ==
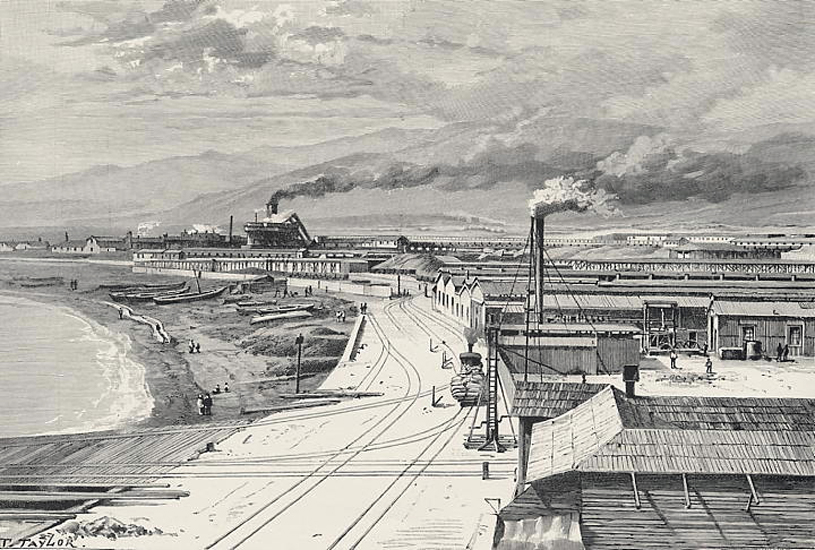
View of the railway pier and saltpeter in Antofagasta, 1876

The railroads arrived in Bolivia driven by economic interests associated with raw material exports, first of saltpeter and later of silver. The Anglo-Chilean Company of Salitres and Ferrocarril de Antofagasta built the first railroad lines in 1873 from the Salar del Carmen to Antofagasta. (Note: First 36 km to Salar El Carmen was built in December 1873 and then the line was extended to Salinas. The use of this route to transport merchandise not associated with the Antofagasta Salting and Railroad Company was a source of tension between the Bolivian government and the Company due to the government's fear that this railroad would compete with the projects it planned to carry out. Mayo (1979, p. 79). See also Pérez Torrico (1994).) In 1879 the Pacific War broke out, after which Chile occupied the region of Antofagasta, which became incorporated into Chile after the signing of the 1884 and the treaty of 1904.

In 1885, the Huanchaca Company of Bolivia and the Salitres and Ferrocarril de Antofagasta signed a contract to extend the line of the port to the establishments of the mining company. According to this agreement, the Company of Salitres supplied equipment and machinery and the Huanchaca Company would deliver 2.6 million pesos. Once at the border, a new company would be formed, totally independent, with preferential rates for the Huanchaca Company. In 1886 the railroad arrived in Calama, very close to the new frontier, which aroused great opposition in Bolivia, considering it more of military than commercial interest. Despite this, the government of Gregorio Pacheco (1884–1888) approved the extension of the railway line from Ascotán to Oruro by law of 19 July 1887. However, when the railway arrived at the border in 1887, the companies did not reach an agreement. To resolve the situation, the Huanchaca Company purchased the railway rights using a loan from English investors. On this basis, The Antofagasta (Chili) Bolivia Railway Co. Ltd. was organized in London on 28 November 1888. In 1889 the Antofagasta–Uyuni section (612 km) was concluded at a cost of £2.2 million. Huanchaca built the Pulacayo–Uyuni branch (36 km) and the Pulacayo–Huanchaca line (12 km) with a tunnel of almost 3 km. In 1892, the line was extended from Uyuni to the city of Oruro (925 km).

The Antofagasta–Oruro railway took over the Bolivian foreign trade that had traditionally passed through Salta, Argentina, but also enabled imported flour to displace the flour produced in Cochabamba in the markets of La Paz and Oruro and imported sugar to replace the sugar produced traditionally in Santa Cruz and sold in the markets of Potosí.

For the mining industry, railways made it possible to reduce the cost of inputs (especially fuel) and increase export volumes by making it competitive to transport ore with lower silver content. For the Huanchaca Mining Company, the connection of the railway to its works contributed to an increase of 87% in average production between the period 1882–1888 and 1889–1895. In the words of the historian Antonio Mitre, "The railroad, at the same time as prolonged the duration of the silver boom in the nineteenth century, began the tin age in the twentieth century."

== Second phase (1900–1929) ==
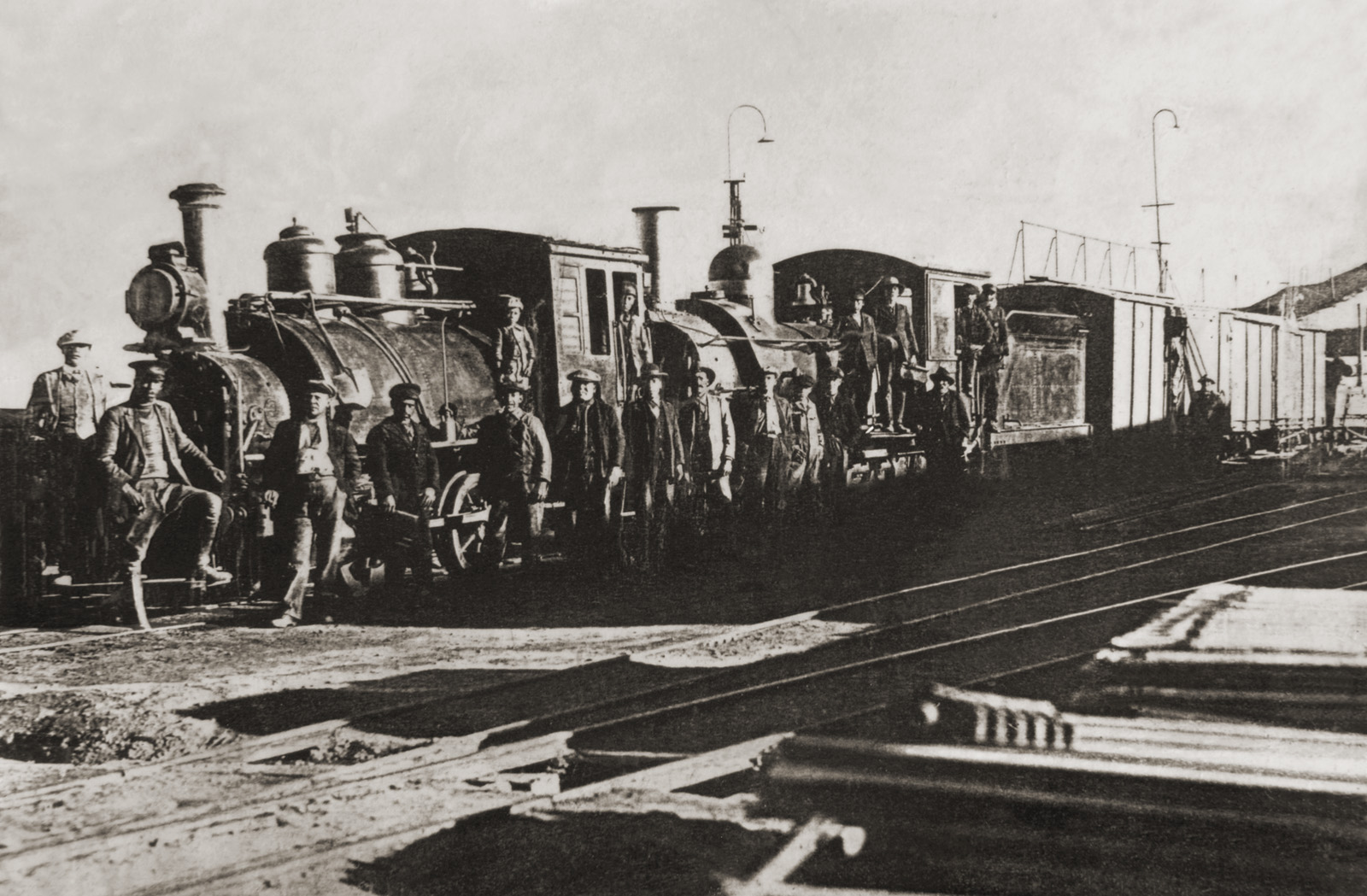
Baldwin and Rodgers Locomotive, Pulacayo, c. 1905

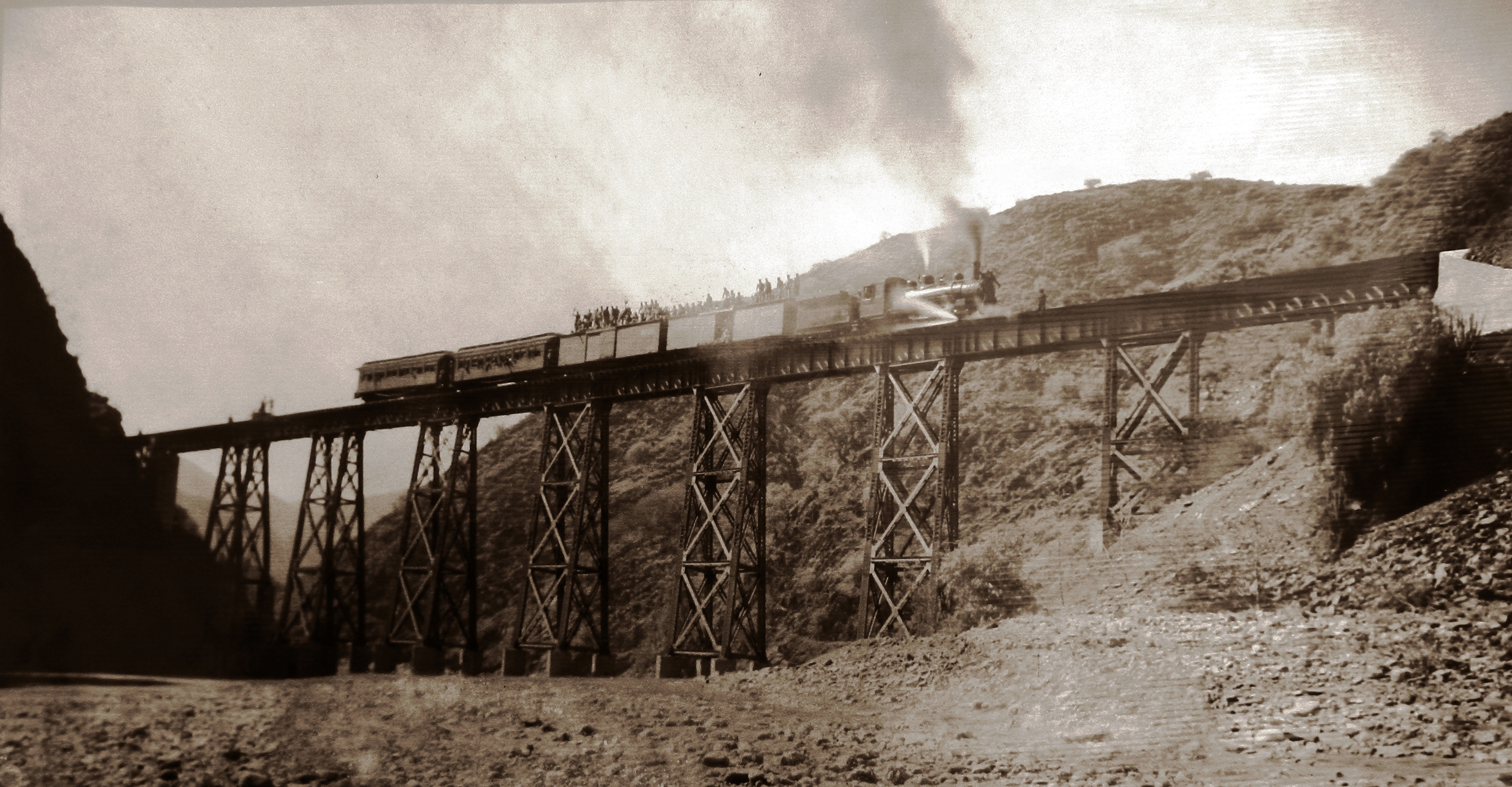
Train between Sucre and Potosí, 1931

Just under half of Bolivia's current rail network was built in the first quarter of the twentieth century. The increase in the construction of railways of the early twentieth century was necessary for the political survival of liberals and republicans. The railroads then had a halo of modernity and development that made them indispensable to any government program. They were perceived as a tool that would allow the colonization of vast territories and contribute to territorial integrity. In order to regulate the process of railway expansion, the government of Juan Misael Saracho promulgated of General Law of Railroads 3 October 1910.

The political and economic necessity of building railways, led to them accounting for 40% of Bolivia's $72 million foreign debt (mostly British, American and French) between 1900 and 1930. The railways were also financed with indemnities received after the Pacific and Acre wars. Under the terms of the Treaty of Petrópolis signed in 1903, Bolivia received £2 million, which was used to fund the Bolivian Railway (formed in 1906 as part of the Speyer loan) to build the main railway. Under the terms of the 1904 Treaty of Peace and Friendship (1904), the Chilean government undertook to build the Arica–La Paz railway, completed in 1913, thereby connecting the country's political and economic center with Arica, a natural port for Upper Peru since colonial times. Private companies also invested in railways. By 1925, more than 50% of the lines in operation had been built with British capital.

In this second phase, two stages are identified in the construction of railways. In the first (1900–1915) railroads were built that intensified the connection of several regions of the country with the Pacific. They were oriented to the foreign market and therefore associated with mining. Two additional exits were made to the Pacific: the Guaqui–La Paz railway (98 km) completed in 1905 and the Arica–La Paz railway (233 km) completed in 1913. In addition, Oruro was communicated with Viacha (237 km) in 1913 (Line that only arrived at La Paz in 1917); and two important branches were built that had great impact on the mining regions: Río Mulatos–Potosí River (174 km) in 1912 and Uyuni–Atocha (90 km) in 1913.

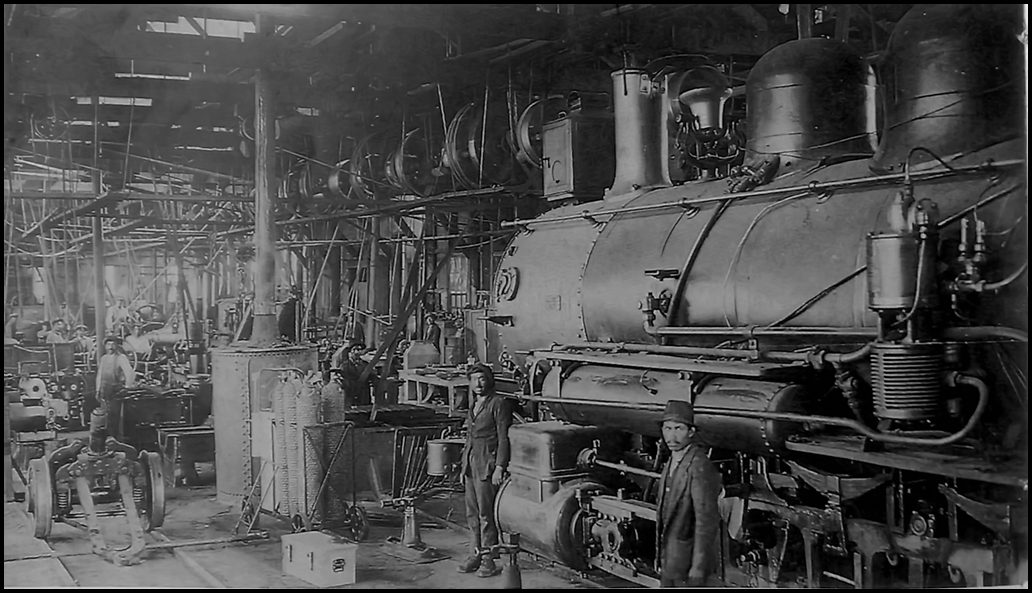
FCAB, main Maestranza in Uyuni, 1925

In the second stage, starting in 1915, the main objective was to integrate domestic markets. The interests that promoted them and their potential beneficiaries were definitely not directly linked to the mining sector. Therefore, the regional elites had to put pressure on the state for the construction of these railroads. The construction of more railroads began to be completed. First, the La Paz–Yungas railroad (with Beni as final destination), started in 1915 and abandoned after less than 80 km of construction in the 1950s due to lack of financing; then the Sucre–Potosí railroad which began in 1916 and could only be completed in 1935; and finally the Cochabamba–Santa Cruz railway, which began in 1928 and remained unfinished. In this period also began (1915) and concluded (1925) the railroad Atocha–Villazón (206 km) that communicated Uyuni with Argentina. Another railroad completed was from Oruro to Cochabamba (205 km). Although it was initiated in the first stage of this period (1906), its conclusion in 1917 marks a transition between the phase of connection with the outside and that of internal integration. Indeed, this railway was the first major integration effort between two major cities and the most expensive of the railroads built in this period (see Table 1). Rodríguez Ostria synthesizes the arrival of the railroad from Oruro to Cochabamba as follows:

— ... After twenty-five years of waiting and conflict (1892–1917), forty thousand vociferous people from the city and neighboring towns contemplated the arrival of the first locomotive on July 26, 1917, which, presumably, four more days late and as if he knew the agony of his waiting, he inaugurated his route with two trips to the city of Oruro. Mr. Arana Peredo, a well-known local journalist who expressed the collective feeling, could write in satisfaction: "Modernism has violated the city's doors."

Together with two exceptions of the first period—the Cochabamba–Vinto (18 km) and Cochabamba–Arani (60 km) railroads built by Luz y Fuerza Eléctrica (which included Simón I. Patiño among its main shareholders) between 1910 and 1913—the Oruro–Cochabamba railway had a major impact on the internal transport of passengers and freight. By lowering transportation costs, railroads allowed the importation of foreign products such as sugar and flour, which displaced local production in La Paz, Oruro, Potosí and Cochabamba itself. However, in the case of flour in Cochabamba, local and domestic railways allowed rather the recovery of regional markets in the 1920s that had been adversely affected by railroads in the late nineteenth and early twentieth centuries. On the other hand, the consolidation of the railway network between Bolivia, Argentina and Chile in the mid-1920s led to the development of cattle exports from Tarija to Argentina.

Table 1. Length and cost of construction of the railways in Bolivia, c. 1928
| Rail and stretch | Length (km) | Total cost (£) | Cost per km (£) | Maximum gradient (%) |
Antofagasta & Bolivia Railway
| Ollague–Uyuni | 175 | 462,000 | 2,750 | 1.1 |
| Uyuni–Oruro | 314 | 1,221,000 | 3,880 | 1.0 |
| Viacha–La Paz | 30 | 400,000 | 13,333 | 2.4 |
Bolivia Railway Co.
| Uyuni–Atocha | 90 | 621,630 | 6,907 | 3.0 |
| Mulatos–Potosí River | 174 | 1,761,702 | 10,120 | 3.0 |
| Oruro–Cochabamba | 205 | 3,898,080 | 19,000 | 2.6 |
| Viacha–Oruro | 202 | 1,241,093 | 6,143 | 1.0 |
Peruvian Corp. Ltd.
| Guaqui–La Paz | 96 | 400,000 | 4,150 | 1.5 (6% income to La Paz) |
| Ferr. Arica–La Paz | 233 | 1,105,000 | 4,742 | 2.0 |
| Ferr. La Paz–Yungas | 53 | 530,000 | 10,000 | 6.0 |
| Ferr. Potosí–Sucre | 100 | 1,150,000 | 11,500 | 3.0 |
| Ferr. Atocha–Villazón | 128 | 2,000,000 (approx.) | 10,100 | 3.0 |
| Ferr. Machacamarca–Uncía | 96 | 991,667 | 10,320 | 2.5 |
| Ferr. Cochabamba–Arani | 60 | 150,000 | 2,500 | 1.5 |
| Cochabamba–Vinto | 18 | 60,000 | 3,800 | 1.5 |
| Ferr. Corocoro–Tarejra | 8 | 41,600 | 5,200 | 1.9 |
| Ferr. Uyuni–Huanchaca | 38 | 228,000 (approx.) | 6,000 | 3.5 |

As can be seen in Table 1, the construction of railways in Bolivia was costly due to the mountainous topography. With the consolidation of the Western network, Bolivia was firmly linked to the Pacific region. The load exported by Antofagasta increased 70% between 1888 and 1904, the load exported by Guaqui to Port of Mollendo 30% between 1900 and 1904 and that exports by Arica doubled between 1914 and 1917.

== Third phase (1930–1963) ==
The mining crisis, parallel to the Great Depression (1929–1239), negatively affected the railways. In the case of the Ferrocarril de Antofagasta a Bolivia (FCAB) (formerly The Antofagasta (Chili) Bolivia Railway Co. Ltd.), its revenues decreased by 30% {1930} between 1930 and 31 and a 25%. In 1932, with the outbreak of the Chaco War in 1932, however, there was an increase in cargo and revenues due to the transportation of troops, ammunition and supplies to the army.

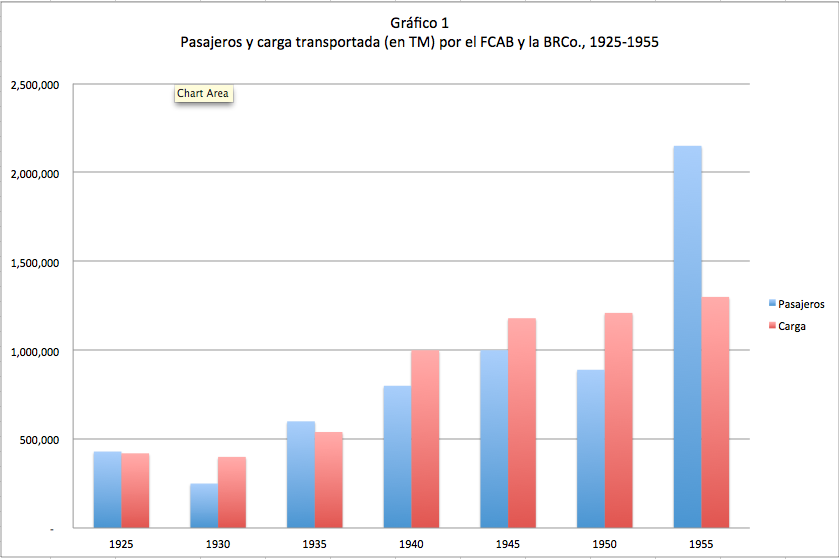
Passengers and freight transported (TM) by the Ferrocarril de Antofagasta to Bolivia (FCAB) and The Transitory (TM) by the FCAB and BRCo., 1925–1955

As shown in Figure 1, there was a steady increase, except in 1930, both in the number of passengers and in the cargo transported between 1925 and 1955. In passenger transport, the sudden increase between 1950 and 1955 may be due To the greater social mobility during the Bolivian National Revolution. In any case, it shows the important role of the railroad in the transport of passengers when they exceeded the mark of two million and its contribution to the integration of the country. This was the highest point in passenger transport in the history of the Bolivian railways.

The rail network in operation in 1930 amounted to 2,233 km. The 58% (1,294 km) was in the hands of foreign companies, the 6% (144 km) belonged to Bolivian mining companies and 36% (795 km) were state lines. However, some state railroads were in turn leased to foreign companies. Thus, more than eight different "companies" operated the railways in Bolivia. This diversity of operators was detrimental to the standardization of rolling stock and hampered policy coordination, which would be further complicated by the construction of the Santa Cruz de la Cruz Sierra to Yacuiba and Corumbá.

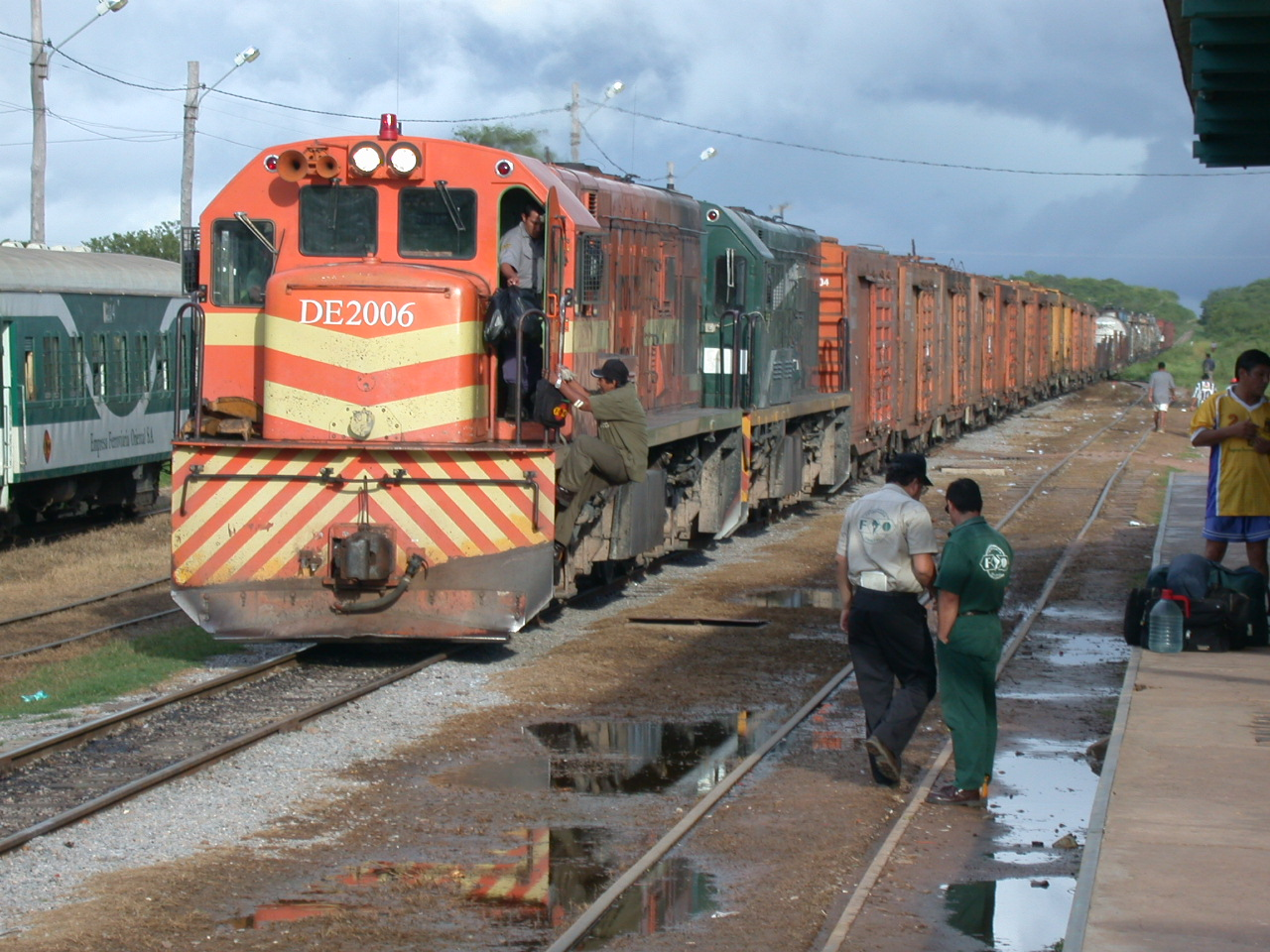
Red Oriental Section San José, 2002

=== Red oriental ===
The construction of the eastern network was undertaken to develop the Santa Cruz region and link it to the Atlantic via the Santa Cruz–Yacuiba railroad (517 km) to the Argentine border and Santa Cruz–Corumbá (600 km) to the Brazilian border, respectively.

The Joint Argentine-Bolivian Railway Commission was established in 1938 to address the construction of the Santa Cruz–Yacuiba railroad. The studies were completed in 1943. The Bolivian government funded the studies and the Argentine government financed the construction of the lines, by installments, and then their subsequent equipment. The government of Bolivia paid Argentina these loans by delivering petroleum. Additionally, under this agreement the Sucre–Tarabuco, completed in 1947. The Yacuiba–Santa Cruz railway was inaugurated on 19 December 1957, fifteen years after the formal beginning of the works.

The line to Brazil, Santa Cruz–Corumbá, was financed in part with a million pounds sterling that Brazil committed to Bolivia for a railroad not completed product of Petropolis Treaty and advances that the government of Brazil made to Bolivia for the construction in 1938. As with Argentina, this financing was amortized by Bolivian oil. The first Brazilian locomotive arrived in Santa Cruz in November 1953 and the railroad was inaugurated 5 January 1955, 17 years after the beginning of the works. The definitive construction of bridges and other minor works lasted until 1970.

As can be seen in the maps, the western (or Andean) and eastern networks are not interconnected. The only way to travel between them is through the Argentine railways in a detour of approximately 600 km (see map upper Bolivian Railways and bordering areas) between Yacuiba and Villazón.

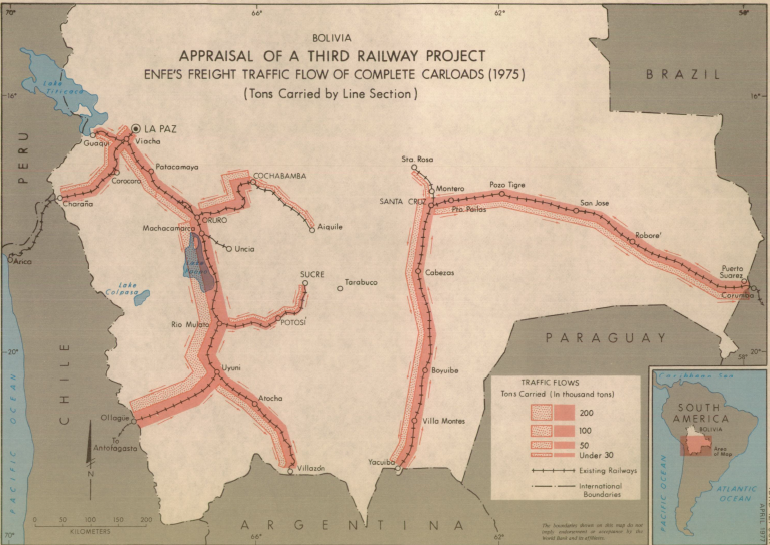
Map of the Bolivian network of railroads showing flow of traffic in the several sections, 1975

== Fourth phase (1964–1996) ==
=== Nationalization and creation of ENFE ===
In 1959, the government of Bolivia took over the administration of the Bolivian Railway Co. lines because it had not reached an agreement on the dismissal of personnel which, according to the company, was the cause of its deficit. The danger of the collapse of the railroad, the government returned the administration of the railroad to the FCAB in 1962. According to Zondag, the Bolivian railways were in very poor condition because between 1952 and 1964 had lost much of the transport of fuels due to the construction of oil pipelines; Transportation of sugar and rice to truck transport; and that of passengers to the greater use of buses. Again, the future of railway development was tied to the performance of mining and the export sector.

The nationalization of the railways of the FCAB and the Bolivian Railway Co. was a process that lasted almost two years (1962–1964). Negotiations on compensation were extended until December 1967 when it was agreed that the compensation would be £2.5 million.

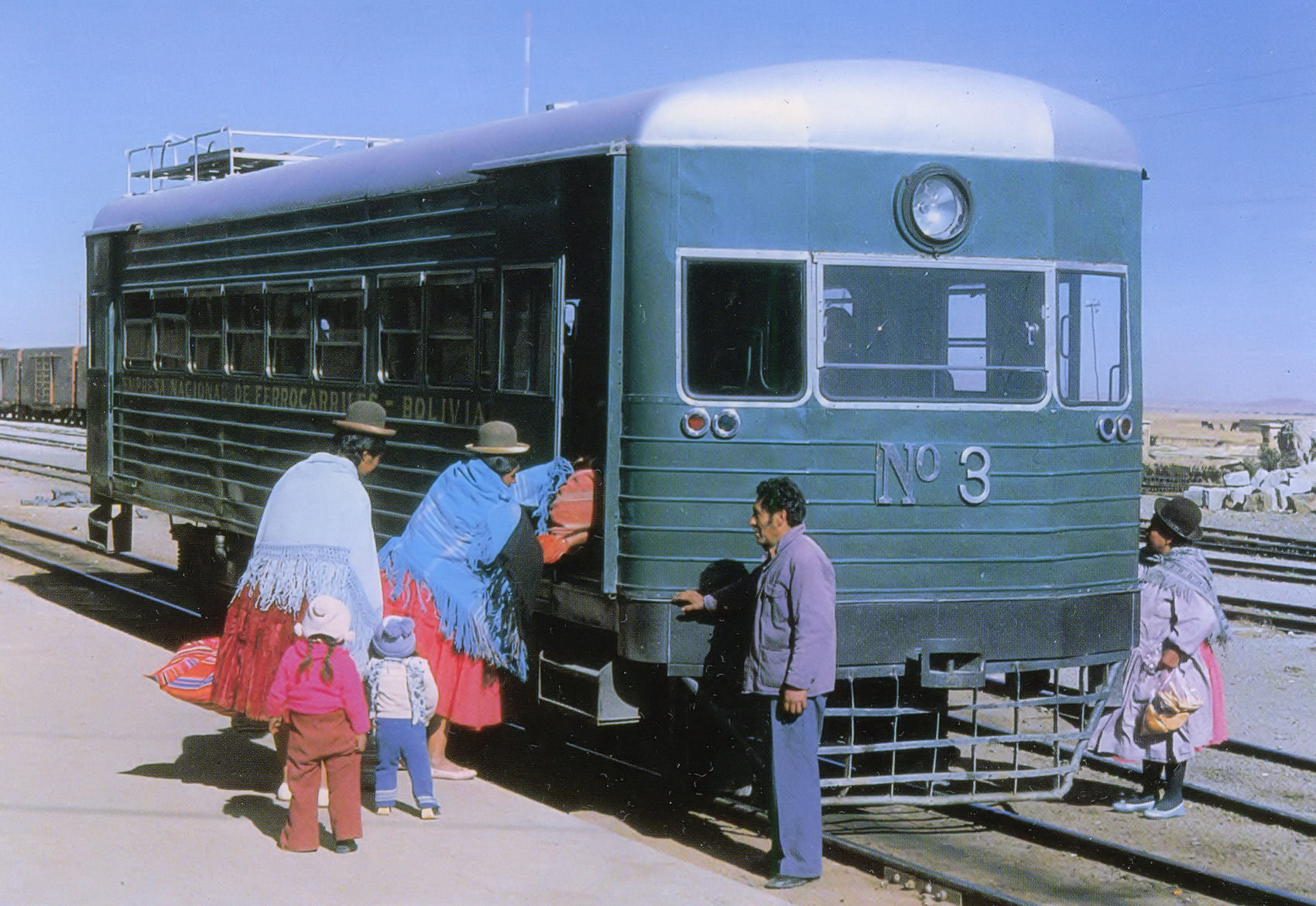
Bus rail of ENFE in Viacha, 1981

The National State Railways Company (ENFE) was created in 1964 to manage the railways of the FCAB and the Bolivian Railway Co. (1199 km) and the state railroads that derived from these lines (992 km). That year also was transferred to ENFE the railroad Santa Cruz–Corumbá. In 1967, the government transferred the railroads of the eastern network, Yacuiba, Santa Cruz to ENFE.

In 1967, the Joint Argentine-Bolivian Commission proposed to extend the line to Argentina north of Santa Cruz, but to reach a navigable port in the Amazon River system. The cost of the first 106 km of this project, up to Santa Rosa, was estimated at $7.7 million, while the second tranche of 105 km, to the Yapacaní River, would have an estimated cost of 10.0 million dollars. On 1 October 1970, the stretch to Santa Rosa was inaugurated. The stretch to Yapacaní is still pending.

At the beginning of the seventies, ENFE faced a number of problems common to other railway companies: low-density traffic operations; Old equipment (see Table 2) and poorly maintained; Lack of experienced management cadres and low level of job training; Lack of a trade policy and inadequate tariff structure; Deficit lines (Sucre–Tarabuco and Cochabamba–Aiquile) and excess personnel. As a result, ENFE was in a precarious economic situation and depended on state subsidies. To address this situation and modernize its equipment (going from locomotives that worked with steam to others that worked with diesel, among others) during the 1960s and 1980s, ENFE received credits from the World Bank and Japanese Cooperation (JICA), as well as technical assistance from the United Nations Development Programme (UNDP).

Table 2. Distribution by age of ENFE rolling stock, 1971
| | Total | Less than 10 years | From 10 to 30 years | More than 30 years |
| Steam locomotives | 92 | – | 48 | 44 |
| Diesel locomotives | 25 | 25 | – | – |
| Diesel locomotives for maneuvers | 4 | 4 | – | – |
| Diesel cars | 12 | 12 | – | – |
| Passenger cars | 198 | – | 3 | 195 |
| Freight cars | 1843 | 100 | 492 | 1251 |

The cargo transported by ENFE between 1965 and 1995 fluctuated according to the performance of the Bolivian economy, but it was upwards reaching almost 1.3 million tons in 1995. During this period, the volume of cargo transported by the Eastern Network was taking increasing importance. While in 1965 it barely represented 9.9% of the total freight carried by ENFE, in 1995 this percentage reached 50% (Table 3).

Table 3. Historical evolution of freight transport: ENFE (1965–1995) and concessionaire companies (2000–2015): Andean and Oriental Networks
| Year | Andean Network (TM) | % | Red Oriental (TM) | % | Total | % |
| 1965 | 893,914 | 90.1 | 98,649 | 9.9 | 992,563 | 100.0 |
| 1970 | 935,714 | 87.0 | 140,320 | 13.0 | 1,076,034 | 100.0 |
| 1975 | 814,782 | 71.4 | 326,259 | 28.6 | 1,141,041 | 100.0 |
| 1980 | 830,030 | 65.0 | 446,495 | 35.0 | 1,276,525 | 100.0 |
| 1985 | 638,998 | 64.3 | 354,059 | 35.7 | 993,057 | 100.0 |
| 1990 | 676,440 | 62.5 | 406,104 | 37.5 | 1,082,544 | 100.0 |
| 1995 | 673,667 | 50.1 | 671,523 | 49.9 | 1,345,190 | 100.0 |
| 2000 | 557,000 | 34.9 | 1,039,000 | 65.1 | 1,596,354 | 100.0 |
| 2005 | 520,000 | 28.3 | 1,320,100 | 71.7 | 1,840,210 | 100.0 |
| 2010 | 1,047,000 | 46.3 | 1,215,688 | 53.7 | 2,262,688 | 100.0 |
| 2015 | 1,053,000 | 38.6 | 1,676,247 | 61.4 | 2,729,247 | 100.0 |
Source: 1965–1990:; 1995:; 2000–2015:

In contrast, the number of passengers carried by ENFE between 1965 and 1995 decreased to almost one-third. While in 1965 it carried 1.6 million passengers, in 2000 they were only 0.65 million. As in the case of cargo, however, the relative importance of the eastern grid grew during this period: it represented 45% of passengers transported in 1995 (Table 4).

Table 4. Historical evolution of passenger transport of ENFE (1965–1995) and concessionaire companies (2000–2015): Andean and Eastern Networks
| Year | Red Andean | % | Red Oriental | % | Total | % |
| 1965 | 1,314,405 | 80.9 | 310,064 | 19.1 | 1,624,469 | 100.0 |
| 1970 | 1,002,352 | 81.5 | 227,587 | 18.5 | 1,229,939 | 100.0 |
| 1975 | 831,859 | 72.4 | 317,080 | 27.6 | 1,148,939 | 100.0 |
| 1980 | 1,207,299 | 70.7 | 500,934 | 29.3 | 1,708,233 | 100.0 |
| 1985 | 1,572,810 | 71.6 | 625,382 | 28.4 | 2,198,192 | 100.0 |
| 1990 | 590,363 | 55.1 | 480,451 | 44.9 | 1,070,814 | 100.0 |
| 1995 | 355,721 | 55.0 | 291,093 | 45.0 | 646,814 | 100.0 |
| 2000 | 205,000 | 30.7 | 462,414 | 69.3 | 667,414 | 100.0 |
| 2005 | 213,800 | 27.2 | 620,600 | 74.4 | 834,400 | 100.0 |
| 2010 | 270,181 | 44.7 | 334,013 | 53.3 | 604,194 | 100.0 |
| 2015 | 211,609 | 72.5 | 80,308 | 27.5 | 291,917 | 100.0 |
Source: 1965–1990:; 1995:; 2000–2015:

== Fifth phase (1997–2013) ==
=== Capitalization ===
The capitalization of railroads, which began in 1995, was made in the context of the neo-liberal reforms of the Gonzalo Sánchez de Lozada government. It was carried out with several objectives: to restructure the sector through the entry of private entrepreneurs; Reduce political interference; Attract capital to improve infrastructure and operations; Regulate the sector by eliminating existing distortions; reduce dependence on the railroad system for state subsidies and generate revenue for the treasury through taxes, and improve transportation in the country. In capitalization, the Bolivian state maintained ownership of the infrastructure and received royalties for the concession. Assets were transferred as rolling stock, workshop equipment, maintenance and communications, stockpiles of spare parts and materials and office furniture and implements.

The capitalization process of ENFE divided the railway system into two companies: Empresa Ferroviaria Andina S.A. and Empresa Ferroviaria Oriental S.A. The Andina Railway Company was formed on the basis of the Andean Network of National Railways (ENFE), with approximately 2,276 km of tracks in the departments of La Paz, Oruro, Cochabamba and Potosí. Since then the Company Ferroviaria Oriental was in control of the US company Genesee & Wyoming. After the capitalization some roads were dismantled, leaving the city of La Paz without a railroad service. The Eastern Railroad Company was formed on the basis of the Western Enterprise Network of Railways, with approximately 1,426 km, crossing the departments of Santa Cruz, Chuquisaca and Tarija. This last network connects the agricultural environment of Santa Cruz and the natural gas-producing region to the south of Bolivia with Argentina and Brazil. Since then and until September 2009 the Company Ferroviaria Oriental was in control of the US company Genesee & Wyoming.

As can be seen in Table 5, both companies are rather small in relation to the others in Latin America and the Eastern railway company carries the most freight.

Table 5. Bolivian railway companies ordered according to tons-km transported and relative position within the 31 main companies of Latin America, 2008.
| Relative position | Railroad | Ton-km (millions) | Tons (millions) | Average distance (km) |
| 20° | East Rail | 787 | 1,29 | 620 |
| 28° | Emp. Andean Rail | 234 | 0.54 | 433 |

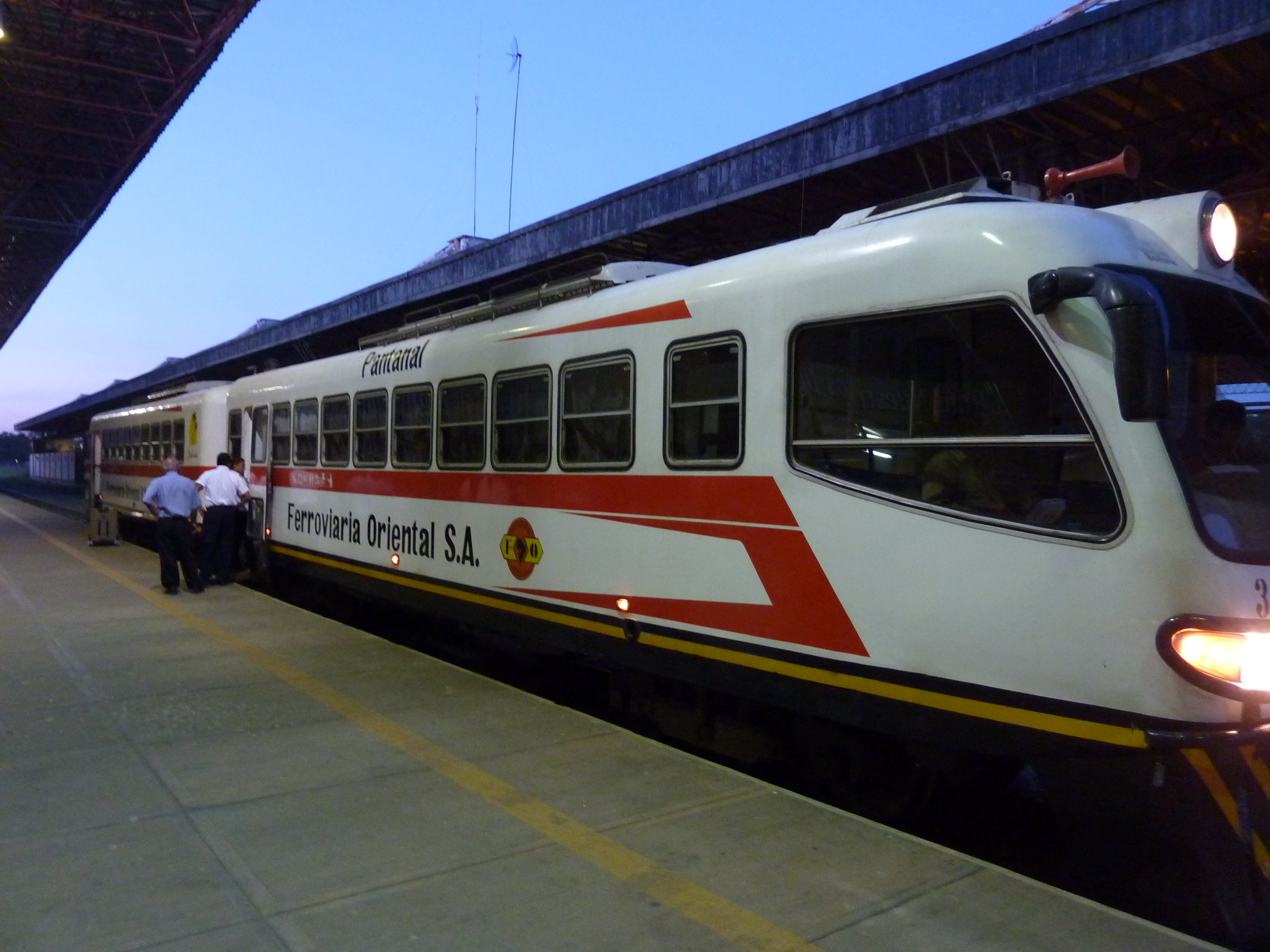
Ferrobús de Santa Cruz a Puerto Suárez, Ferroviaria Oriental S.A., 2010

Bolivia is the only case in Latin America and Caribbean in which freight concessionaires also offer long-distance passenger services. The railway transport of passengers is still significant in those corridors where there are no permanent roads. In the Andean network services are provided between Oruro, Uyuni, Tupiza and Villazón; in the international connection Uyuni–Abaroa with Chile; and in the internal lines, Cochabamba–Aiquile and Potosí–Sucre. Passenger transport in these sections amounts to more than 200,000 per year. In the eastern network, passenger transport is even greater, mainly between Santa Cruz and Santa Cruz, bordering Brazil, which mobilizes 500,000 passengers per year. In total, both railroads carry approximately 800,000 passengers per year.

As a result of capitalization, the state succeeded in transforming subsidies in the order of $10 million annually to the former ENFE into income through taxes and fees of about $2.5 million. The private companies met their investment commitments. In addition, the average train speed increased; less derailment occurred and the cost of freight transportation was reduced. However, passenger tariffs were raised, in part because they were previously subsidized. At the same time, the coverage of the rail system was reduced by closing several unproductive branches, which were returned by the private companies to the State. In fact, 3,692 km were transferred to private enterprises in 1997 and in 2011 they operated 1,954 km, that is 47.1% less.

If the mining of the silver and then the tin began the construction of railroads at the end of the nineteenth century and beginning of the twentieth century, then of the interlude by the construction of the Eastern network in the middle of the last century—as to "close the circle" in the history of the railways in Bolivia—at the beginning of the century again the laying of railway lines. This time is the exploitation of silver, lead and zinc in San Cristóbal. In order to transport zinc-silver and lead-silver concentrates from the concentration plant to the Uyuni–Antofagasta railway, the Minera San Cristóbal company built a railway branch with a gauge of one meter wide and 65 km in length. On average, the mine exports about 1,300 tonnes of zinc-silver concentrates and 300 tonnes of lead-silver concentrates every day.

=== Future Challenges ===
The interconnection between the eastern and Andean networks is a project pending since the middle of the twentieth century. Several alternatives have been considered and the most studied line has been the one that links Aiquile in Cochabamba (Andean network) with Santa Cruz (Eastern network) approximately 400 km. The most relevant traffic to justify such work is the transport of iron ore from El Mutún on the border with Brazil to the Pacific.

The estimated cost of the work is less than one billion dollars. However, it amounts to three billion dollars considering the investment needed to rehabilitate the roads and improve the layout of the networks in Bolivia and Chile to raise the weight per axle to 25 tons and make financially viable investment.

During his trip to China in December 2013, President Evo Morales talked to General Secretary of the Chinese Communist Party Xi Jinping about the possibility of building the interconnection between the Andean and Eastern network as part of the interoceanic corridor to link the Atlantic with the Pacific. Thus Bolivian exports would be directed towards the Peruvian port of Ilo. The Chinese paramount leader requested a pre-feasibility study for 2014.

== See also ==
- Juan Rivero Torres
- History of Bolivia
- Rail transport in Bolivia

== Bibliography ==
- Aramayo Avila, Cesáreo (1959). Ferrocarriles bolivianos; pasado, presente, futuro. La Paz: Imp. Nacional.
- Bieber, Enrique León (1984). Las relaciones económicas de Alemania con Bolivia, 1880-1920. Berlín: Colloquium Verlag. ISBN 3767806053.
- Blakemore, Harold (1990). From the Pacific to La Paz: The Antofagasta (Chili) and Bolivia Railway Company 1888-1988. Londres: Lester Crook Academic Publishing. ISBN 1870915097.
- Castro Bozo, Ángel (2013). La mayor inversión boliviana (1825-2000). La Paz: CEPAA.
- CEPAL (1972). Análisis Socioeconómico del Departamento de Santa Cruz de la Sierra (Bolivia), Vol. V (PDF).
- Cibilis, Vicente (2006). Bolivia public policy options for the well-being of all. Washington, DC: World Bank. ISBN 0821366629.
- Condarco Morales, Ramiro (1985). Aniceto Arce. Artífice de la extensión de la revolución industrial y forjador de la República de Bolivia. La Paz: Amerindia.
- Contreras, Manuel (1993). Estaño, ferrocarriles y modernización, 1900-1930. La Paz: Universidad Andina Simón Bolivar-INDEAA.
- Dirección General de Obras Públicas (1930). Informe del 24 de abril al Cónsul de EE.UU. en La Paz. RG84. College Park, MD: US National Archives.
- Empresa Ferroviaria Andina S.A. (2015). Memoria Anual (PDF). Archived from the original (PDF) on 6 March 2017.
- Ferroviaria Oriental S.A. (2015). Memoria Anual (PDF).
- Johnson, Carmen (1999). Ferrocarriles. Utopía y realidad. La Paz: Editorial La Razón, Historias bajo la lupa. La Guerra Federal, Fascículo 12.
- Kogan, Jorge H. (2004). Rieles con futuro: desafíos para los ferrocarriles de América del Sur. Caracas: Corporación Andina de Fomento.
- Kohon, Jorge (2011). Más y mejores trenes: Cambiando la matriz de transporte en América Latina y el Caribe (PDF). Nota Técnica No. IDB-TN-303. Banco Interamericano de Desarrollo, Sector de Infraestructura y Medio Ambiente. Archived from the original (PDF) on 7 April 2014.
- Langer, Erick (1989). Economic Change and Rural Resistance in Southern Bolivia, 1880–1930. Stanford, California: Stanford University Press. ISBN 0804714916.
- Limpias Ortiz, Víctor Hugo (2009). Las ferrovías y la carretera que transformaron el oriente boliviano, 1938-1957. Santa Cruz de la Sierra: El País.
- Marsh, Margaret Alexander (1928). The Bankers in Bolivia. A Study in American Foreign Investment. Nueva York: AMS Press.
- Mayo, John (1979). La Compañía de Salitres de Antofagasta y la Guerra del Pacífico (PDF). Vol. 14. Historia. Archived from the original (PDF) on 8 September 2014.
- Mitre, Antonio (1981). Los patriarcas de la plata. Estructura socioeconómica de la minería boliviana en el siglo XIX. Lima: Instituto de Estudios Peruanos.
- Naciones Unidas (1951). Informe de la Misión de Asistencia Técnica de las Naciones Unidas a Bolivia. Nueva York: Naciones Unidas.
- Pérez Torrico, Alexis (1994). El estado oligárquico y los empresarios de Atacama (1871-1878). La Paz: Ediciones Gráficas EG.
- Rodríguez Ostria, Gustavo (2012). "¡Ferrocarril o nada! La lucha por la locomotora en Cochabamba, 1892 - 1927". Estudios del Ishir. Revista Estudios del ISHiR. ISSN 2250-4397. Archived from the original on 3 October 2012.
- Unidad de Análisis de Políticas Sociales y Económicas (2010). Área Macrosectorial: Tomo IV El Sector del transporte (PDF).
- World Bank (1972). Bolivia - Railway Project. Transportation projects series no. PTR 111 (PDF).
- World Bank (1986). Bolivia-Third Railway Project (PDF).
- Zondag, Cornelius H. (1968). La economía boliviana, 1952-1965. La Revolución y sus consecuencias. La Paz: Los Amigos del Libro.
