= Argentina–Bolivia border =

International border

Coordinates: 22°14′S 62°39′W

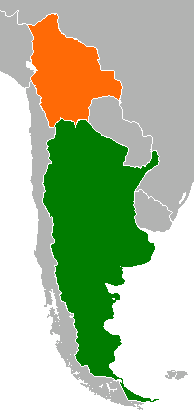
Locator map of Argentina and Bolivia

The Argentina–Bolivia border is the international boundary between Argentina and Bolivia. From west to east, the border goes from the Altiplano to extend to the Chaco flat through the tropical environment of the Yungas.

== Crossing points ==
From east to west there are three main crossing points:

- Villazón - La Quiaca (Horacio Guzmán International Bridge over La Quiaca River)
- Bermejo - Aguas Blancas
- Yacuiba - Profesor Salvador Mazza (Pocitos)

== Gallery ==
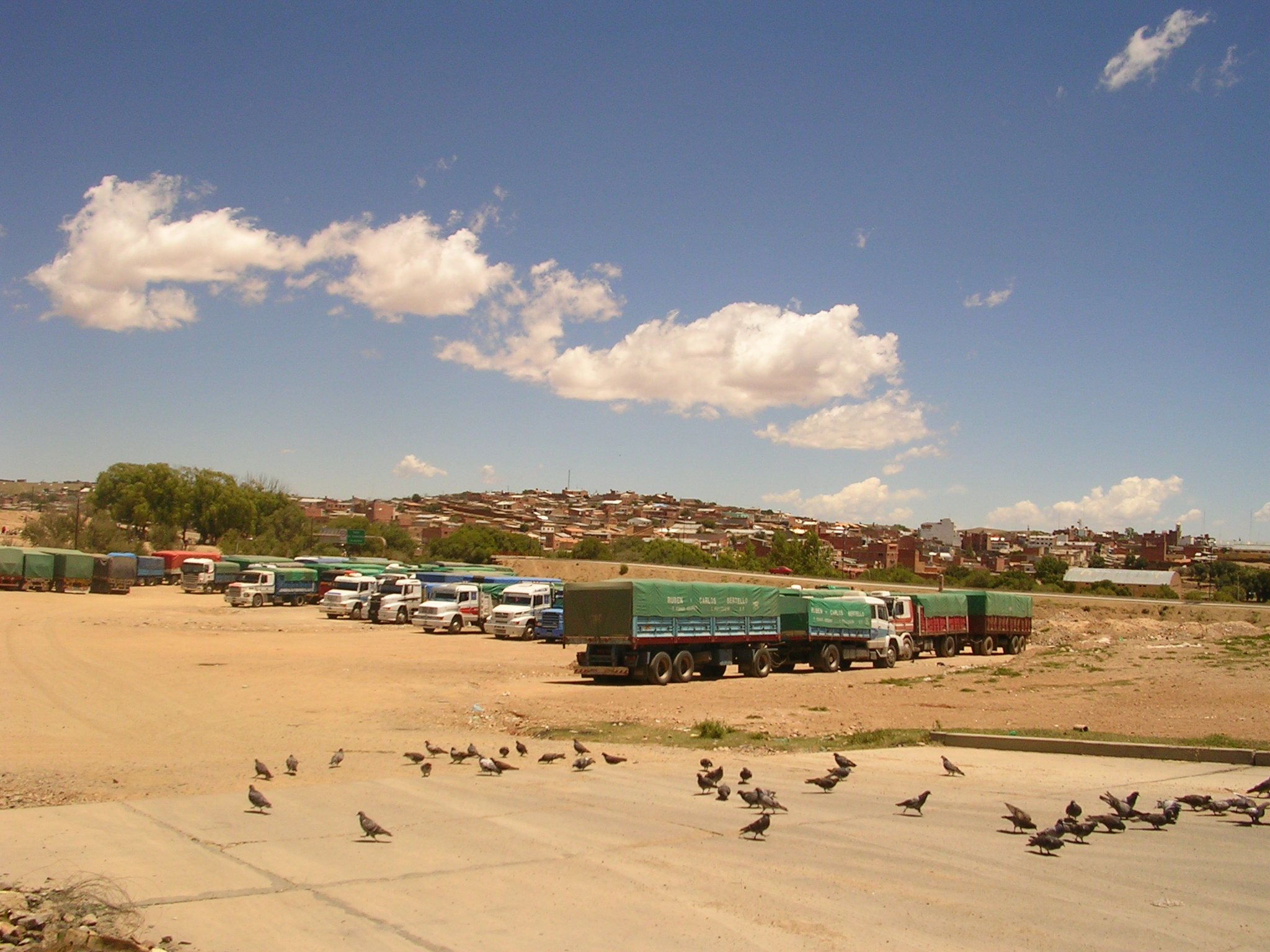
Border post of La Quiaca.

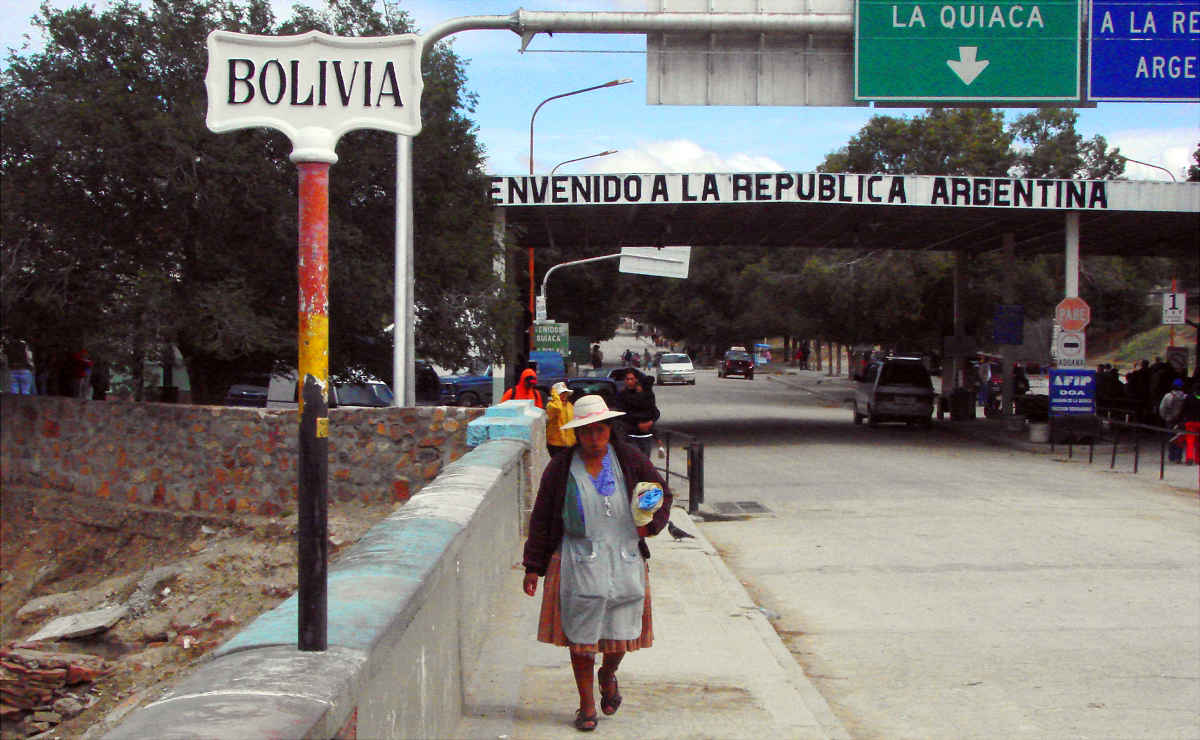
Viewed from Bolivia

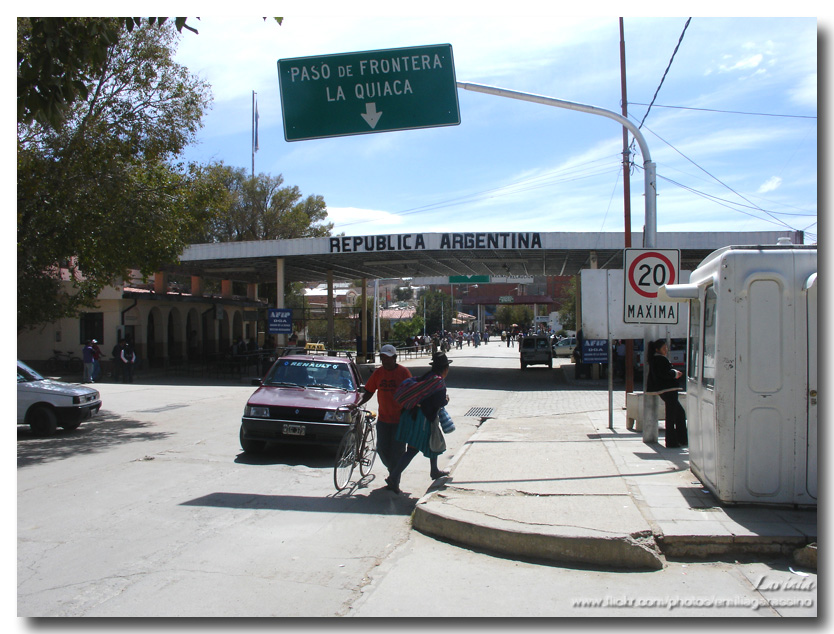
Another view leaving Argentina
