= National Route 9 (Argentina) =

Highway in Argentina

National Route 9
- Ruta nacional 9

Route information
- Length: 1,967 km (1,222 mi)

Major junctions
- North end: Route 14 (Bolivia) at the Bolivian border at Horacio Guzmán International Bridge in La Quiaca
- ,,,,,,,,,,,,,,,,,,,,,,,,,,,
- South end: to Avenida Lugones

Location
- Country: Argentina
- Major cities: Florida, Boulogne, Tortuguitas, Campana, Zárate, San Nicolás de los Arroyos, Empalme Villa Constitución, Rosario, Cañada de Gómez, Villa María, Córdoba, Jesús María, Santiago del Estero, San Miguel de Tucumán, Rosario de la Frontera, Metán, Salta, San Salvador de Jujuy, La Quiaca.

Highway system
- Highways in Argentina

National Route 9 (in Spanish, Ruta Nacional 9) is a major road in Argentina, which runs from the center-east to the northwest of the country, crossing the provinces of Buenos Aires, Santa Fe, Córdoba, Santiago del Estero, Tucumán, Salta and Jujuy. It starts on Avenida General Paz, which marks the border between the Autonomous City of Buenos Aires and the surrounding province of the same name, and ends at the Horacio Guzmán International Bridge, on the La Quiaca River, traversing 1,967 km (1,222 mi). The road is a limited access motorway from Buenos Aires to Rosario.

Between the cities of San Nicolás de los Arroyos and Rosario (distant about 65 km (40 mi) from each other), the road is named Teniente General Juan José Valle.

== History ==
=== Beginnings ===
The route originated as the "Camino Real del Perú" (Royal Road of Peru), used since colonial times to travel from Buenos Aires, through Córdoba, Santiago del Estero, San Miguel de Tucumán, Salta, San Salvador de Jujuy, and Potosí, continuing to Peru. The section between Buenos Aires and the south of what it is today Cordoba Province, was shared with the "Camino Real del Oeste" (Royal Road of the West) which branched towards San Luis, Mendoza and Santiago (Chile). The road had a system of small inns and establishments every 30–50 km where travellers could rest.

After the coming of the railroad, in the second half of the 19th century, this road lost relevance, as the railroad provided faster service in any type of weather. The first train from Buenos Aires arrived in the town of La Quiaca in Argentina's northern border with Bolivia on 30 December 1907.

With the advent of the automobile, the Federal Government decided to build roads throughout the Republic. In 1936 the road from Buenos Aires to La Quiaca was named Ruta Nacional 9 (National Route 9). In 1943 the road was open to traffic in its full length, even though most of it was unpaved.

The road started competing against the railroad, taking passengers and cargo. The last passenger train to La Quiaca arrived in December 1993, and the last cargo train in July 1994.

=== Pavement ===
The Buenos Aires to Rosario section was paved by 27 December 1936. The work reached Córdoba on 5 June 1937. It should be mentioned that National Route 9 had a different layout in those days, as the road traversed through Pilar to Pergamino on the roadbed of today's National Route 8 and then it turned north going to Rosario.

The road between Congress Square (Plaza Congreso) in Buenos Aires and San Martín Square in Córdoba was 768 km (477 mi) long, with 42 bridges, 1,412 sewer covers and 17 level crossings, with a cost of 41,000,000 pesos moneda nacional, equivalent to 12,000,000 US dollars at the time. In 1939 access to Buenos Aires from Pilar was completed, passing through Campo de Mayo and San Martín.

Change of road layout for National Route 9 in 1943

In those days, the Buenos Aires - General Pacheco - Campana - Zárate section was part of National Route 12. In 1943 Buenos Aires Province transferred the road section Campana - San Nicolás under construction to the national government, making it part of National Route 9, along with the Buenos Aires - Campana section of Route 12. This way they shortened the road distance between the two most populous cities in Argentina. You can see in the map the new road layout of National Route 9 in red, and the old one in green.

In 1950 the Dirección Nacional de Vialidad (Public Works Dept) paved the Ramallo to San Nicolás de los Arroyos section, and between 1952 and 1953 they finished the Campana to Atucha section and in 1956 the road was fully paved from Buenos Aires to Rosario.

After the change of layout in 1979, the route was fully paved except for a short piece north of Humahuaca, in Jujuy Province, which was an improved road. Works to finalize the route started in 1997 and were extended until 30 April 2004, opening to the public on 21 January 2005.

=== Divided lanes ===
==== Buenos Aires - Rosario Highway ====
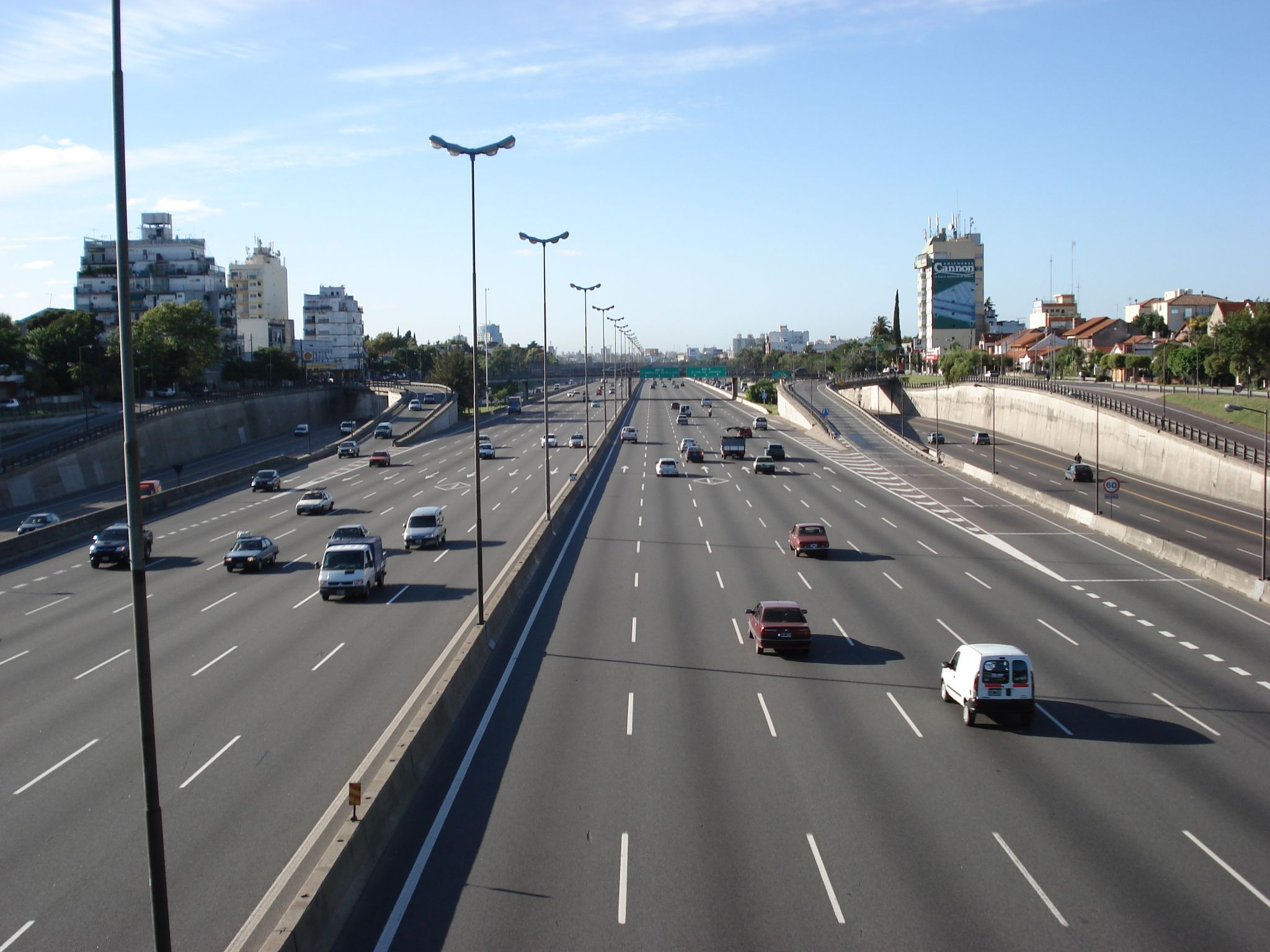
Highway 9 leading north from Buenos Aires

The section passing through Greater Buenos Aires to the Port of Campana access road is part of "Acceso Norte" (a 120 km-length road that runs from Avenida General Paz (Buenos Aires city border) to Route 9, with branches to Tigre and Pilar through National Route 8). The section between Avenida General Paz to the start of Route 8 is named "Autopista Pascual Palazzo" (by Decree 17/1981).

In 1943 the Dirección Nacional de Vialidad presented a plan for access to the city of Buenos Aires. Based on this plan, by the end of the forties work was started in what is known today as "Acceso Norte" (North Access) to Buenos Aires, reaching the town of Garín in 1959. In 1971 the section Garín-Campana was opened. In 1977 the Campana-Zárate highway was opened, allowing access to the Zárate-Brazo Largo Bridge inaugurated that same year. In the year 1978 the section from San Nicolás de los Arroyos to Rosario was opened. This section is called “Teniente General Juan José Valle” (Law 26,927, which derogates Decree 2,146/1979 that had called it "Teniente General Pedro Eugenio Aramburu"). In 1987 the last section of this highway was completed, between Campana and the Tala River.

==== Rosario – Córdoba Highway ====
The Rosario – Córdoba highway project dates from 1970. On this project they would build a highway between these two cities over a new road, leaving the original road with one lane each way for local traffic, as it lies next to the Ferrocarril General Bartolomé Mitre railroad, and traverses through the center of the different towns along its path.

On 12 November 1986, construction of the new highway between Córdoba and Villa María was bid, but the project never came to fruition. The highway was started by two of the contractor companies on this route in the 1990s as part of the concession contracts. The agreement only included the sections from Avenida de Circunvalación de Córdoba to Pilar and from Avenida de Circunvalación de Rosario to Armstrong. On this last section, the Covicentro company only built the road to Carcarañá.

In the year 2000 the national government opened a bid for the 109 km (68 mi) between Pilar and Villa María, with the contract only covering one lane in the section from Oliva to Villa María, with the winning bid from Benito Roggio e Hijos. In February 2006 the same group secured the contract from Oliva to Villa María and the 36 km (22 mi) from Villa María to Ballesteros, while the works on the 62 km (39 mi) between Ballesteros and Leones was given to the IECSA company, belonging to Grupo Macri.

On 3 May 2006, the national government opened the bidding process for the remaining sections of the highway in Santa Fe Province. The DYCASA company took charge of the section between Carcarañá and Armstrong, while a joint venture of Esuco and Chediack obtained the contracts for the highway between Armstrong and Tortugas...

The highway was fully inaugurated on 22 December 2010.

==== Salta Province ====
In the decade of the 2000s the section shared with National Route 34 in Salta Province became a four-lane road (two on each way).

=== Right of way changes of 1979 ===
The National Government by Decree 1595 in 1979 where several routes changed to provincial jurisdiction and vice versa, also changed the layout and right-of-way of some of them.

==== Greater Buenos Aires ====
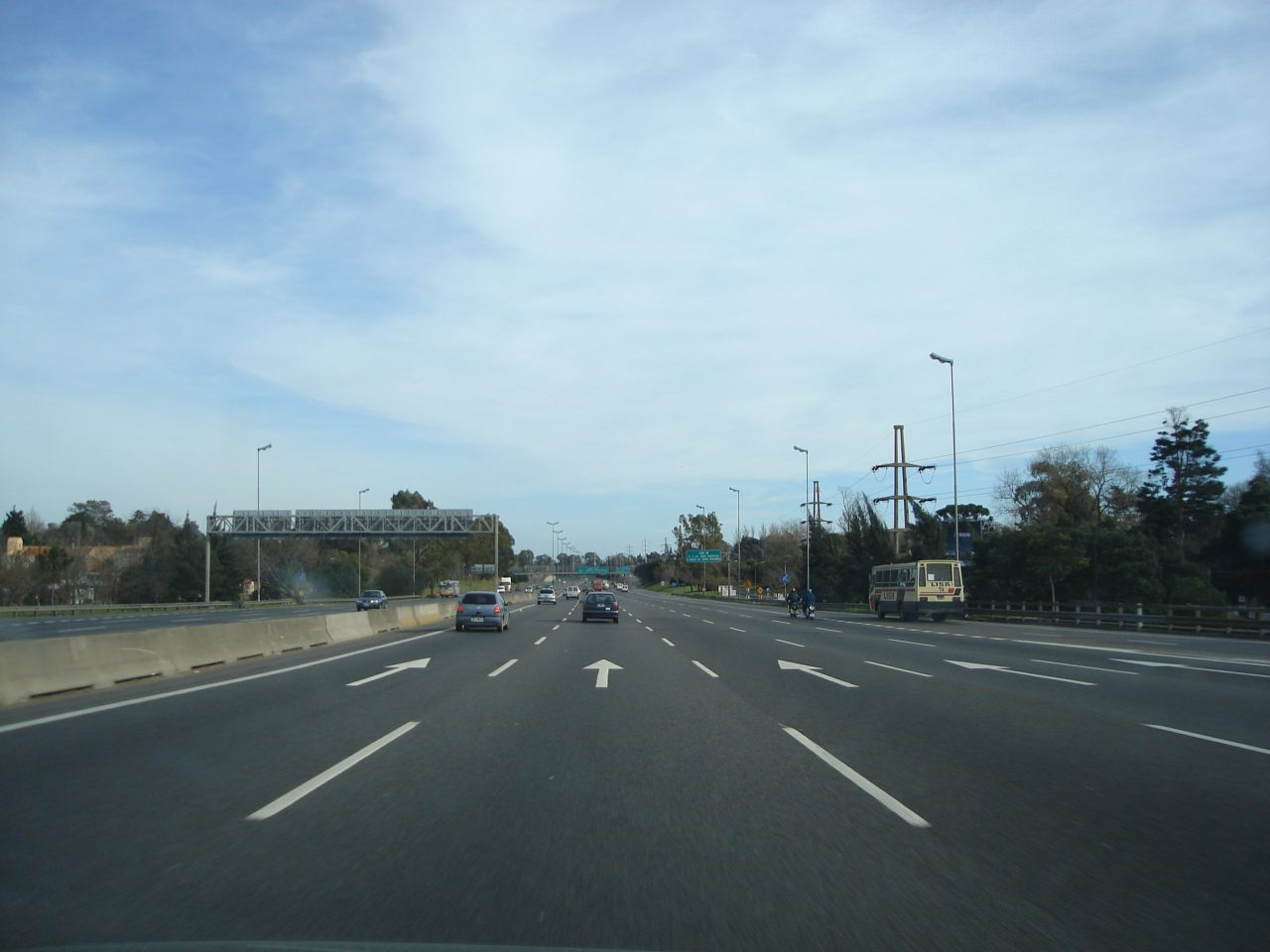
National Route 9, San Isidro, north of Buenos Aires

In Greater Buenos Aires, before the completion of the Accesso Norte, Route 9 ran through the present streets Boulogne Sur Mer, Presidente Sarmiento and Constituyentes Ave. in Tigre Partido. This 15 km (9 mi) section from Don Torcuato and the border between Benavídez and Garín left national jurisdiction by the aforementioned decree. Nowadays it is part of Provincial Route 9.

==== Buenos Aires - Santa Fe Province limits ====
Between San Nicolás de los Arroyos (Buenos Aires Province) and Rosario (Santa Fe Province), the road run closer to the Paraná River, northwest of the Ferrocarril General Bartolomé Mitre railway. After construction of the San Nicolás de los Arroyos - Rosario highway southeast of said railway line at the end of the 1970s, this road changed to provincial control by the aforementioned decree. The transferred sections were 16.5 km (10.3 mi) in Buenos Aires Province (how secondary Provincial Route 098–06, also known as Presidente Illia access) and 68.8 km (42.8 mi) in Santa Fe Province (now Provincial Route 21).

==== Tucumán - Salta Province Limits ====
Change of right of way in Salta Province

In Salta Province, 1 km (0.6 mi) north of the Salta-Tucumán border, the road turned to the west then north, turning into a mountain road, 104 km (65 mi) packed dirt until the town of La Viña. This section was transferred to Salta Province, changing its name to Provincial Route 6. Between the aforementioned town and the city of Salta, the road ran for 79 km (49 mi). This section remained under national jurisdiction, with the new name of National Route 68.

As of 2007 Provincial Route 6 is still unpaved and in some sections it is almost impassable.

On 30 October 1980 the Dirección Nacional de Vialidad and its provincial counterpart signed an agreement to transfer National Route 9 inside the city of Salta between the bridge over the Arenales river and Vidt street to provincial control. The agreement was ratified by de facto provincial law.

The old road is shown in green and the new one in red in the map.

== Distances and important cities ==
The following table shows the distances traversed by National Route 9 in each different province, and important cities that it passes by (or near).

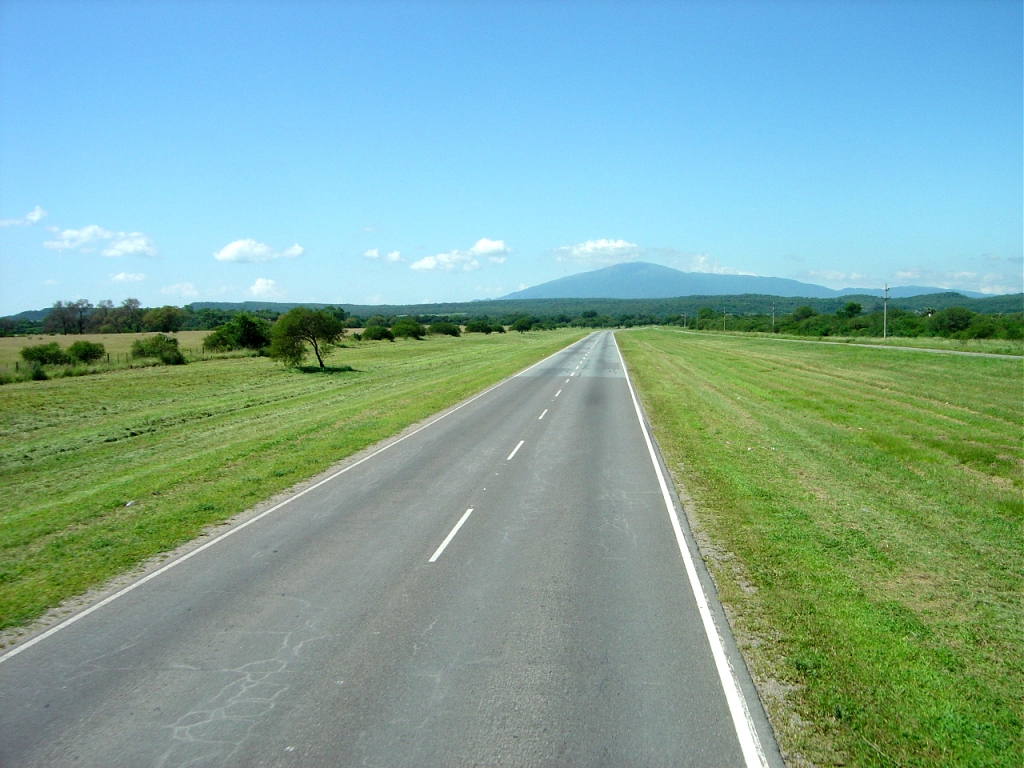
Route 9 in Tucumán

Province	From	To	Length	Passes by
Buenos Aires	km 12	km 237	225 km	Campana, Zárate, San Nicolás de los Arroyos
Santa Fe	km 237	km 419	182 km	Villa Constitución, Rosario, Cañada de Gómez
Córdoba	km 419	km 910	491 km	Bell Ville, Villa María, Córdoba
Santiago del Estero	km 910	km 1223	313 km	Santiago del Estero, Termas de Río Hondo
Tucumán	km 1223	km 1371	148 km	San Miguel de Tucumán
Salta	km 1371	km 1648	277 km	Rosario de la Frontera, General Güemes, Salta
Jujuy	km 1648	km 1979	318 km	San Salvador de Jujuy, Humahuaca, La Quiaca

== See also ==
- Pan-American Highway
