= Pumawasi =

Pumawasi (Quechua puma cougar, puma, wasi house, "puma house", Hispanicized spellings Pomaguasi, Pomahuasi, Pumaguasi, Pumahuasi) may refer to:

- Pumahuasi, a municipality in the Yavi Department, Jujuy Province, Argentina
- Pumahuasi District or Daniel Alomías Robles District, a district in the Huánuco Region, Peru
- Pumawasi, Anta, cave with pre-Columbian rock-art in the Anta Province, Cusco Region, Peru
- Pumawasi (Paruro), a mountain in the Paruro Province, Cusco Region, Peru
