= Horacio Guzmán International Bridge =

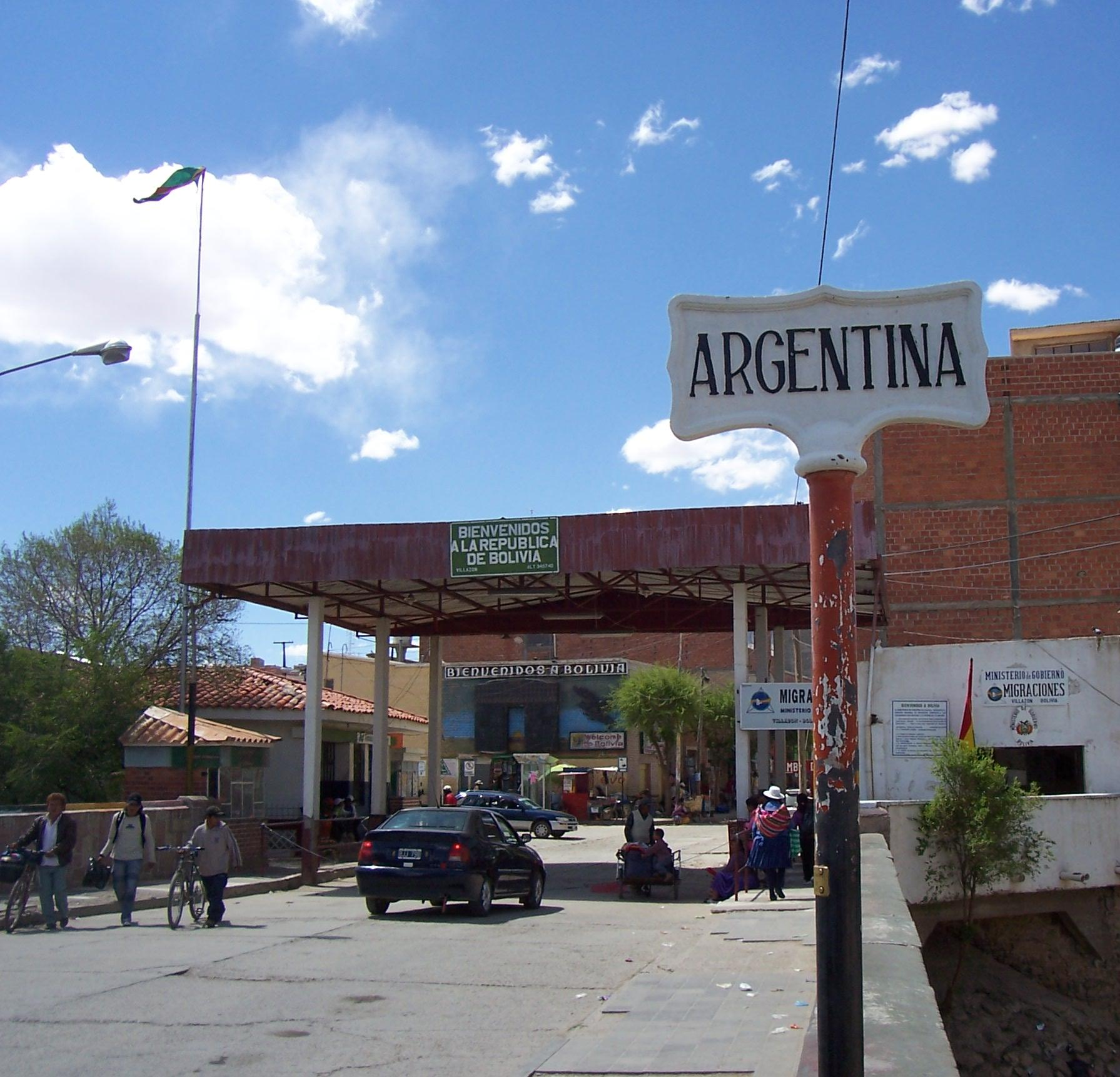
- Coordinates: 22°06′S 65°36′W
- Crosses: La Quiaca River
- Locale: La Quiaca, Jujuy Province, Argentina; Villazón, Potosí Department, Bolivia
- Official name: Puente Internacional Horacio Guzmán (in Spanish)

Characteristics
- Total length: 7.8 metres (26 ft)

History
- Opened: 9 July 1960

Location
- Interactive map of Horacio Guzmán International Bridge

The Horacio Guzmán International Bridge is a bridge that links the city of La Quiaca, Jujuy Province, Argentina, with the city of Villazón, in the Potosí Department of Bolivia, crossing the La Quiaca River. The concrete bridge, 31 meters long and 7.8 meters wide, was opened on 9 July 1960.

It is accessed from the south by National Route 9, while from the north it is accessed by Route 14. As the customs of both countries are not integrated, the procedures must be carried out on both banks of the La Quiaca River. A lot of attention should be paid in case of visiting this area with minors, since the customs controls are practically null and it is possible to move from Argentina to Bolivia walking along the bridge without showing identity documents, even with minors.

It is the only border crossing enabled in the province of Jujuy to the neighboring Plurinational State of Bolivia.

== See also ==
- List of international bridges
