= Yavi Department =

Yavi Departamento Yavi
- Department
- Interactive map of Yavi
- Country: Argentina
- Seat: La Quiaca

Area
  - Total: 2,942 km^{2} (1,136 sq mi)

Population (2022)
  - Total: 25,868
  - Density: 8.793/km^{2} (22.77/sq mi)
- Time zone: UTC−3 (ART)

Yavi is a department of the province of Jujuy (Argentina).
