= Sapecho =

Coordinates: 15.5589°S 67.3347°W

- Town
- Interactive map of Sapecho
- Country: Bolivia
- Time zone: UTC-4 (BOT)

Sapecho is a small town in Bolivia. As of 2008, it had a population of 935. Agriculturally, the town produces cocoa beans.

== Climate ==
Climate data for Sapecho, elevation 410 m (1,350 ft)
Month	Jan	Feb	Mar	Apr	May	Jun	Jul	Aug	Sep	Oct	Nov	Dec	Year
Mean daily maximum °C (°F)	32.0 (89.6)	31.7 (89.1)	31.7 (89.1)	31.3 (88.3)	29.4 (84.9)	28.1 (82.6)	28.5 (83.3)	30.4 (86.7)	31.9 (89.4)	32.9 (91.2)	32.8 (91.0)	32.8 (91.0)	31.1 (88.0)
Daily mean °C (°F)	26.5 (79.7)	26.4 (79.5)	26.4 (79.5)	25.7 (78.3)	24.1 (75.4)	22.9 (73.2)	22.5 (72.5)	23.6 (74.5)	24.7 (76.5)	26.2 (79.2)	26.6 (79.9)	26.9 (80.4)	25.2 (77.4)
Mean daily minimum °C (°F)	21.0 (69.8)	21.2 (70.2)	21.0 (69.8)	20.1 (68.2)	18.8 (65.8)	17.7 (63.9)	16.5 (61.7)	16.8 (62.2)	17.6 (63.7)	19.4 (66.9)	20.2 (68.4)	21.0 (69.8)	19.3 (66.7)
Average precipitation mm (inches)	210.3 (8.28)	188.4 (7.42)	176.3 (6.94)	112.3 (4.42)	59.2 (2.33)	51.5 (2.03)	35.4 (1.39)	58.8 (2.31)	79.8 (3.14)	119.9 (4.72)	131.7 (5.19)	188.6 (7.43)	1,412.2 (55.6)
Average precipitation days	15.2	14.9	12.5	8.6	6.6	6.2	4.8	5.1	6.4	8.5	9.2	12.4	110.4
Average relative humidity (%)	84.8	86.1	86.1	86.3	86.8	86.7	84.9	82.8	80.8	80.6	81.1	83.3	84.2
Source: Servicio Nacional de Meteorología e Hidrología de Bolivia
