= Salvador Mazza, Salta =

Profesor Salvador Mazza (Pocitos)
- City
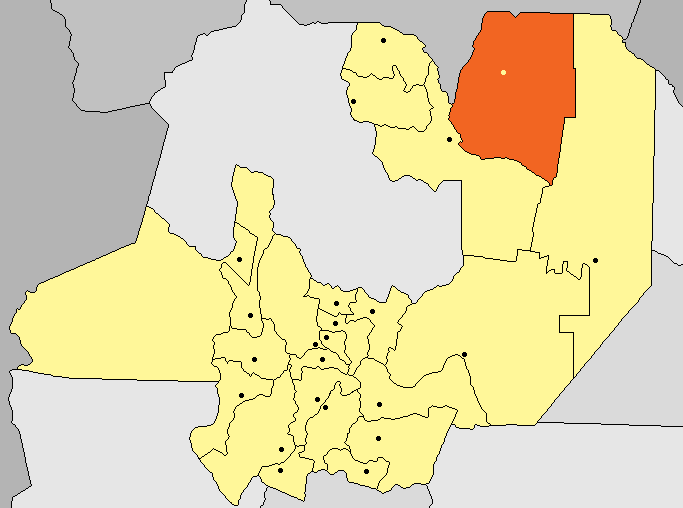

- Location in Salta Province
- Coordinates: 22°03′S 63°42′W
- Country Argentina: Argentina
- Province: Salta
- Department: General José de San Martín

Government
  - Intendant: Gustavo Subelza (PJ)
- Elevation: 804 m (2,638 ft)

Population (2010 census [INDEC])
  - Total: 20,670
- Time zone: UTC−3 (ART)
- CPA Base: A 4568

Salvador Mazza or Profesor Salvador Mazza (also known as Pocitos) is a city in northern Argentina, in Salta Province, 400 km (249 mi) north of the capital city of Salta, and 55 km (34 mi) from the city of Tartagal on National Route 34 in General José de San Martín Department, on the international border with Bolivia.

National Route 34 and an important railway branch of the Ferrocarril General Manuel Belgrano connect Salvador Mazza with the rest of Argentina and with Santa Cruz de la Sierra in Bolivia.

It is the northernmost city in Argentina, contrary to popular belief that La Quiaca in Jujuy Province holds that distinction.

== Population ==
Salvador Mazza has a population of 16,068 according to the 2001 census, which represents an increment of 71.7% over the 9,387 in 1991. It is estimated that the current population is around 25,000 inhabitants.

== Name ==
The name of the town has been given in honour of Salvador Mazza, an Argentine physician and epidemiologist of Italian origin, best known for his strides in helping control American trypanosomiasis an endemic disease among the rural, poor majority of early 20th century South America.

== Climate ==
Climate data for Salvador Mazza, Salta/Pocitos (1951–1990)
| Month | Jan | Feb | Mar | Apr | May | Jun | Jul | Aug | Sep | Oct | Nov | Dec | Year |
|---|---|---|---|---|---|---|---|---|---|---|---|---|---|
| Daily mean °C (°F) | 24.0 (75.2) | 23.2 (73.8) | 22.2 (72.0) | 19.5 (67.1) | 17.1 (62.8) | 14.2 (57.6) | 14.0 (57.2) | 15.6 (60.1) | 18.0 (64.4) | 21.4 (70.5) | 22.7 (72.9) | 23.6 (74.5) | 19.6 (67.3) |
| Average precipitation mm (inches) | 206 (8.1) | 190 (7.5) | 192 (7.6) | 96 (3.8) | 37 (1.5) | 17 (0.7) | 5 (0.2) | 6 (0.2) | 8 (0.3) | 49 (1.9) | 116 (4.6) | 180 (7.1) | 1,102 (43.4) |
Source: Instituto Nacional de Tecnología Agropecuaria
