= La Quiaca =

- City
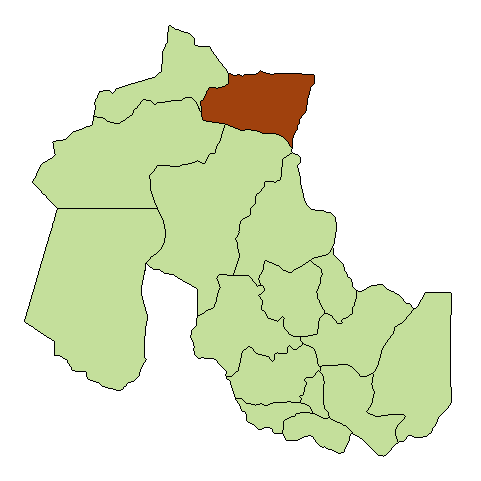

- Location in Jujuy Province
- Coordinates: 22°06′15″S 65°35′50″W
- Country: Argentina
- Province: Jujuy
- Department: Yavi
- Elevation: 3,442 m (11,293 ft)

Population (2010 census [INDEC])
  - Total: 13,761
- CPA Base: Y 4650
- Area code: 03885

La Quiaca is a small city in the north of the province of Jujuy, Argentina, on the southern bank of the La Quiaca River, opposite the town of Villazón, Bolivia. It lies at the end of National Route 9, 289 km (180 mi) from San Salvador de Jujuy (the provincial capital), and at an altitude of 3,442 m (11,293 ft) above mean sea level. La Quiaca is an approximate antipode to Hong Kong.

La Quiaca has 13,761 inhabitants as per the 2010 census [INDEC]. It is the head town of the Yaví Department, which includes also the towns of Barrios, Cangrejillos, El Cóndor, Pumahuasi, and Yaví. The area is serviced by an airport located at 22°09′02″S 65°34′39″W.

As one of the principal urban centers in the Puna de Atacama, La Quiaca offers the full range of basic infrastructure, including potable water, electricity, sewage systems, and internet connectivity. It plays a key role in supporting tourism and local commerce, and stands out as one of the few settlements in the Argentine high-altitude plateau region with modern amenities, making it a strategic stop for travelers exploring the Andean northwest.

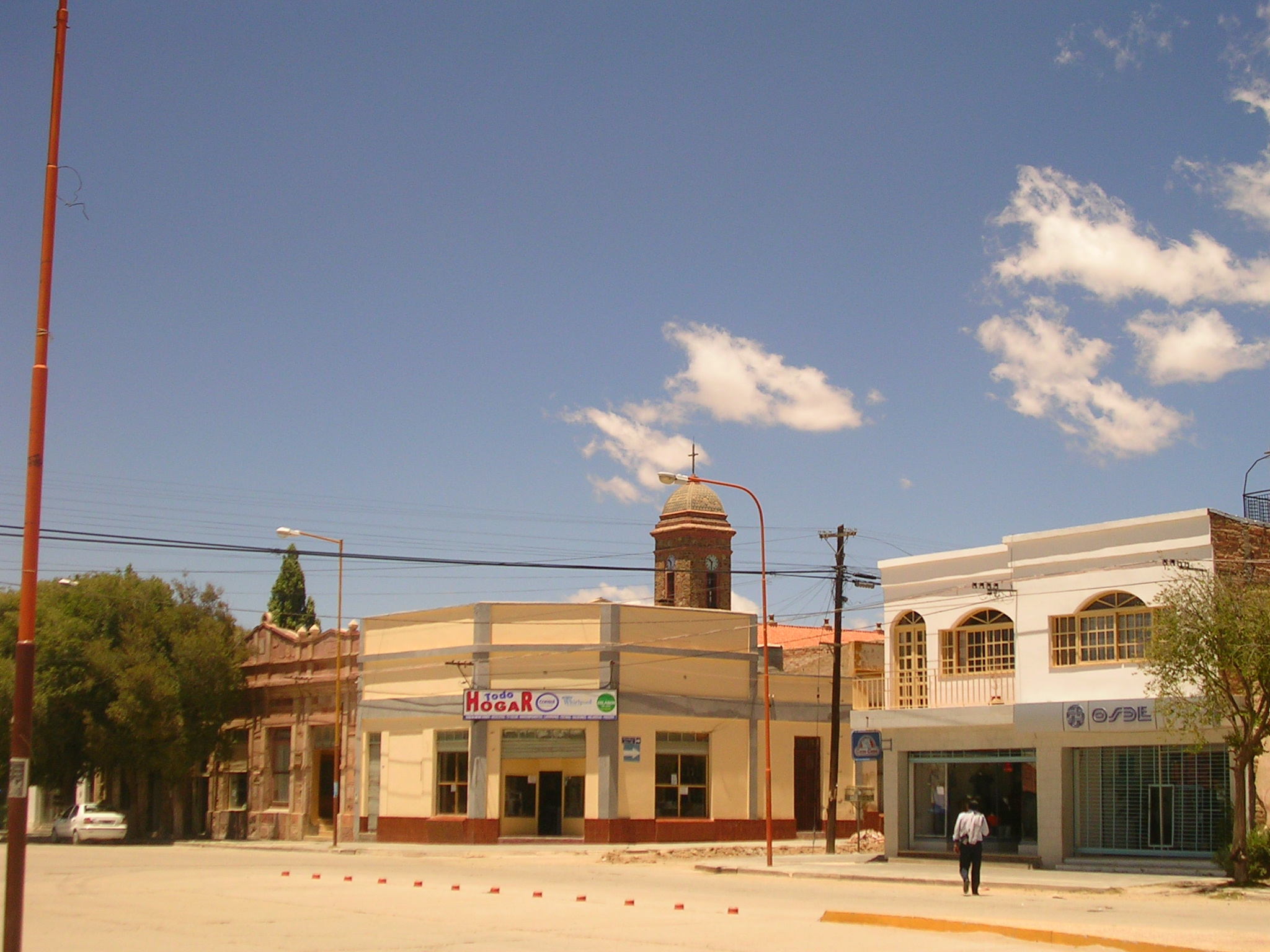
La Quiaca, Jujuy.

Domestically, this city is the classic reference to the northern end of the country, though in reality this distinction is held by the town of Salvador Mazza, or Pocitos, in the province of Salta. In 1985, after a three-year national tour, the renowned composer León Gieco released a folk album called De Ushuaia a La Quiaca ("From Ushuaia to La Quiaca").

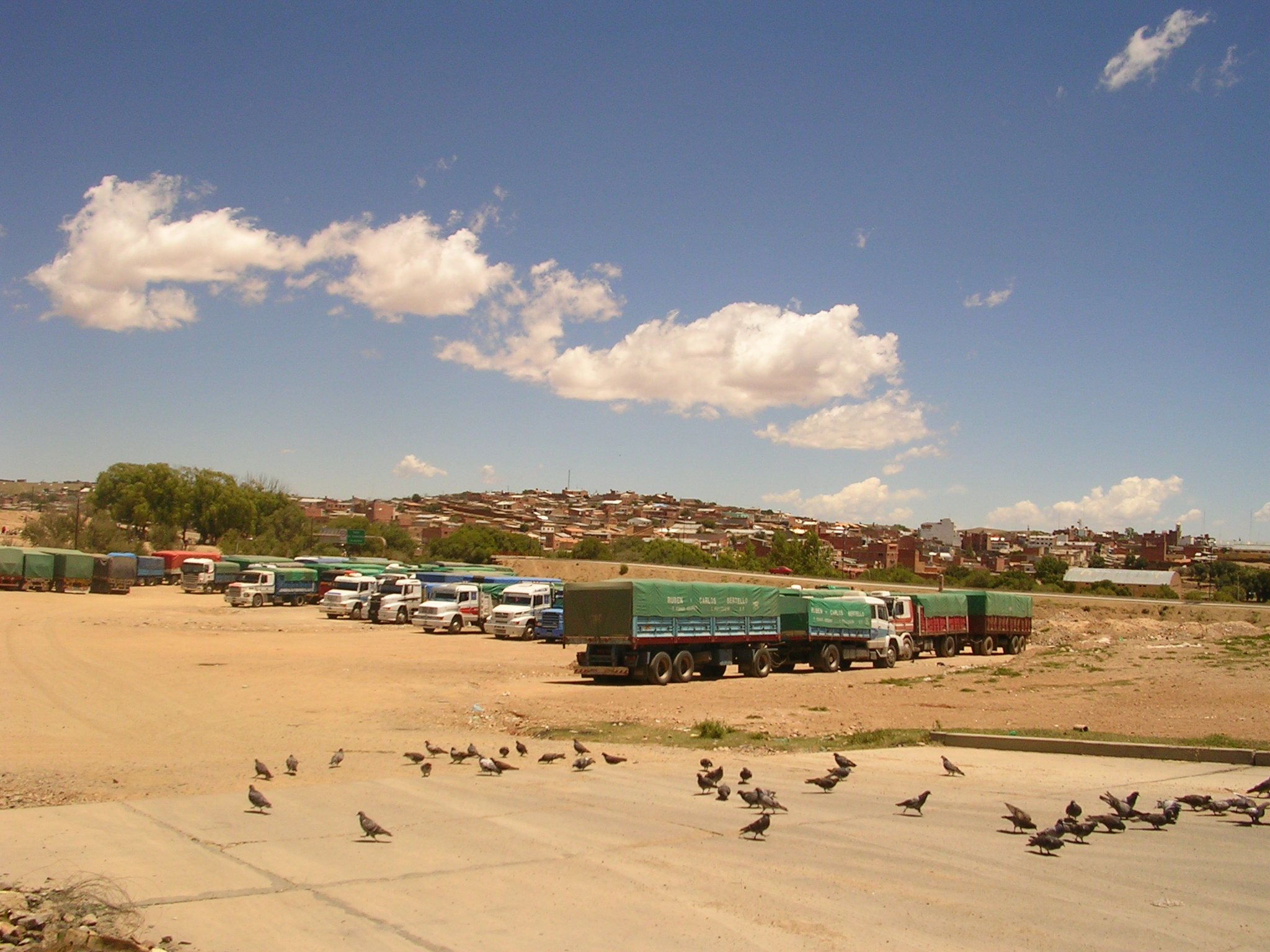
Trucks at La Quiaca on the border between Argentina and Bolivia (with the town of Villazón (Bolivia) in the background).

== Geography ==
=== Climate ===
In spite of its location within the tropics, because it is located at over 3,400 metres (11,200 ft) above sea level, La Quiaca has a cold semi-arid climate (BSk, according to the Köppen climate classification), with an annual precipitation of 351.6 mm (14 in). During winter months, temperatures during the day are mild, averaging 14.7 °C (58.5 °F) in July while the nights can get freezing cold, with temperatures dropping well below 0 °C (32.0 °F). Precipitation is rare during the winter months although snowfalls are possible. During the summer months, temperatures during the day are mild to warm, averaging 19 to 20 °C (66 to 68 °F) although nighttime temperatures can remain cool. Most of the precipitation that La Quiaca receives falls during the summer months. It is possibly the sunniest place in Argentina, averaging 3410 hours of sunshine or 76.9% of possible sunshine ranging from a low of 62.5% in February to a high of 87.5% in July. The highest temperature recorded was 28.8 °C (83.8 °F) on February 4, 1998, while the lowest temperature was −15.2 °C (4.6 °F).

Climate data for La Quiaca, Argentina (1991–2020, extremes 1961–present)
Month	Jan	Feb	Mar	Apr	May	Jun	Jul	Aug	Sep	Oct	Nov	Dec	Year
Record high °C (°F)	27.7 (81.9)	28.8 (83.8)	28.0 (82.4)	25.5 (77.9)	25.2 (77.4)	22.7 (72.9)	21.7 (71.1)	24.5 (76.1)	27.2 (81.0)	27.4 (81.3)	28.5 (83.3)	28.6 (83.5)	28.8 (83.8)
Mean daily maximum °C (°F)	20.6 (69.1)	20.4 (68.7)	20.6 (69.1)	20.3 (68.5)	17.8 (64.0)	16.3 (61.3)	16.1 (61.0)	18.0 (64.4)	20.0 (68.0)	21.7 (71.1)	22.5 (72.5)	22.2 (72.0)	19.7 (67.5)
Daily mean °C (°F)	13.2 (55.8)	13.0 (55.4)	12.8 (55.0)	11.3 (52.3)	7.3 (45.1)	4.8 (40.6)	4.5 (40.1)	7.0 (44.6)	10.0 (50.0)	12.4 (54.3)	13.4 (56.1)	13.9 (57.0)	10.3 (50.5)
Mean daily minimum °C (°F)	7.7 (45.9)	7.6 (45.7)	6.6 (43.9)	3.1 (37.6)	−2.5 (27.5)	−5.7 (21.7)	−6.2 (20.8)	−4.0 (24.8)	−0.4 (31.3)	3.3 (37.9)	5.5 (41.9)	7.3 (45.1)	1.9 (35.4)
Record low °C (°F)	1.7 (35.1)	−0.1 (31.8)	−1.0 (30.2)	−7.9 (17.8)	−12.6 (9.3)	−14.6 (5.7)	−15.2 (4.6)	−14.8 (5.4)	−11.2 (11.8)	−6.3 (20.7)	−3.5 (25.7)	0.4 (32.7)	−15.2 (4.6)
Average precipitation mm (inches)	102.2 (4.02)	67.9 (2.67)	48.1 (1.89)	6.8 (0.27)	1.1 (0.04)	0.0 (0.0)	0.0 (0.0)	1.2 (0.05)	3.9 (0.15)	14.4 (0.57)	22.2 (0.87)	63.2 (2.49)	331.0 (13.03)
Average precipitation days (≥ 0.1 mm)	15.1	12.1	9.3	2.2	0.4	0.1	0.1	0.2	1.0	3.3	6.3	11.4	61.5
Average snowy days	0.0	0.0	0.0	0.0	0.1	0.0	0.1	0.1	0.1	0.1	0.0	0.0	0.2
Average relative humidity (%)	62.6	63.2	60.3	46.0	32.6	27.4	25.7	26.7	32.1	42.4	48.6	55.8	43.6
Mean monthly sunshine hours	263.5	228.8	269.7	288.0	297.6	285.0	297.6	303.8	291.0	306.9	303.0	275.9	3,410.8
Percentage possible sunshine	63.5	62.5	70.5	82.0	85.5	86.5	87.5	85.5	80.0	78.0	76.0	65.5	76.9
Source 1: Servicio Meteorológico Nacional (normals and extremes)
Source 2: Secretaria de Mineria (sun 1961–1990)

== See also ==
- Humahuaca
- Iruya
- Tilcara
- Purmamarca
