= Pumahuasi =

Coordinates: 22°17′S 65°41′W

- Rural municipality and village
- Interactive map of Pumahuasi
- Country: Argentina
- Province: Jujuy Province
- Time zone: UTC−3 (ART)

Pumahuasi (Hispanicized spelling of Quechua Puma Wasi, puma cougar, wasi house, "cougar house") is a rural municipality and village in Jujuy Province in Argentina.
