= La Quiaca River =

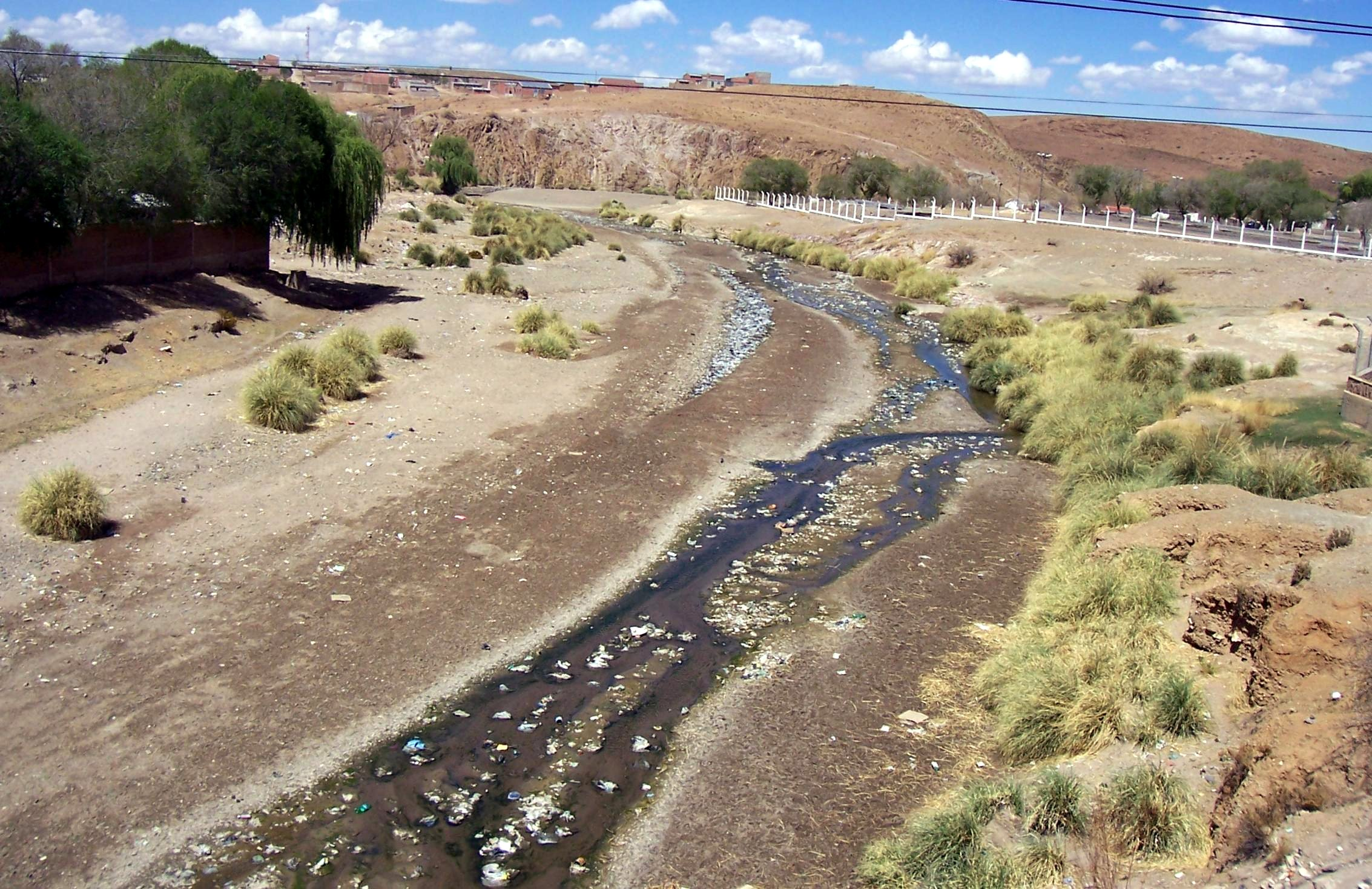

Location
- Countries: Argentina and Bolivia
- Province: Jujuy
- Department: Potosí
- Cities: La Quiaca; Villazón

Physical characteristics
- Mouth: San Juan del Oro River
  - location: Toquero

La Quiaca River (Spanish: Río La Quiaca), also known as Villazón River, is a river of reduced flow on the border between Argentina and Bolivia. It is highly contaminated in its passage through the cities of La Quiaca and Villazón, on its right and left margins, respectively.

Between these two cities, across the river, is the Horacio Guzmán International Bridge, which is the only step enabled between the Argentine province of Jujuy and the Potosí Department.

This river originates in Toquero and runs from west to east. After passing through La Quiaca, head north towards Bolivia. Its tributaries are the streams of Tafna, the Marsh, Sansana, Yavi and Yavi Chico. It flows into the San Juan del Oro River which in turn joins the Cotagaita River to form the Camblaya River which with the name of Pilaya River ends at the Pilcomayo River.

The Argentine National Gendarmerie, through the Environmental Patrol of the La Quiaca Squadron is dedicated to the river cleaning project.
