= Villazón =

Villazón Wiyacha
- Town
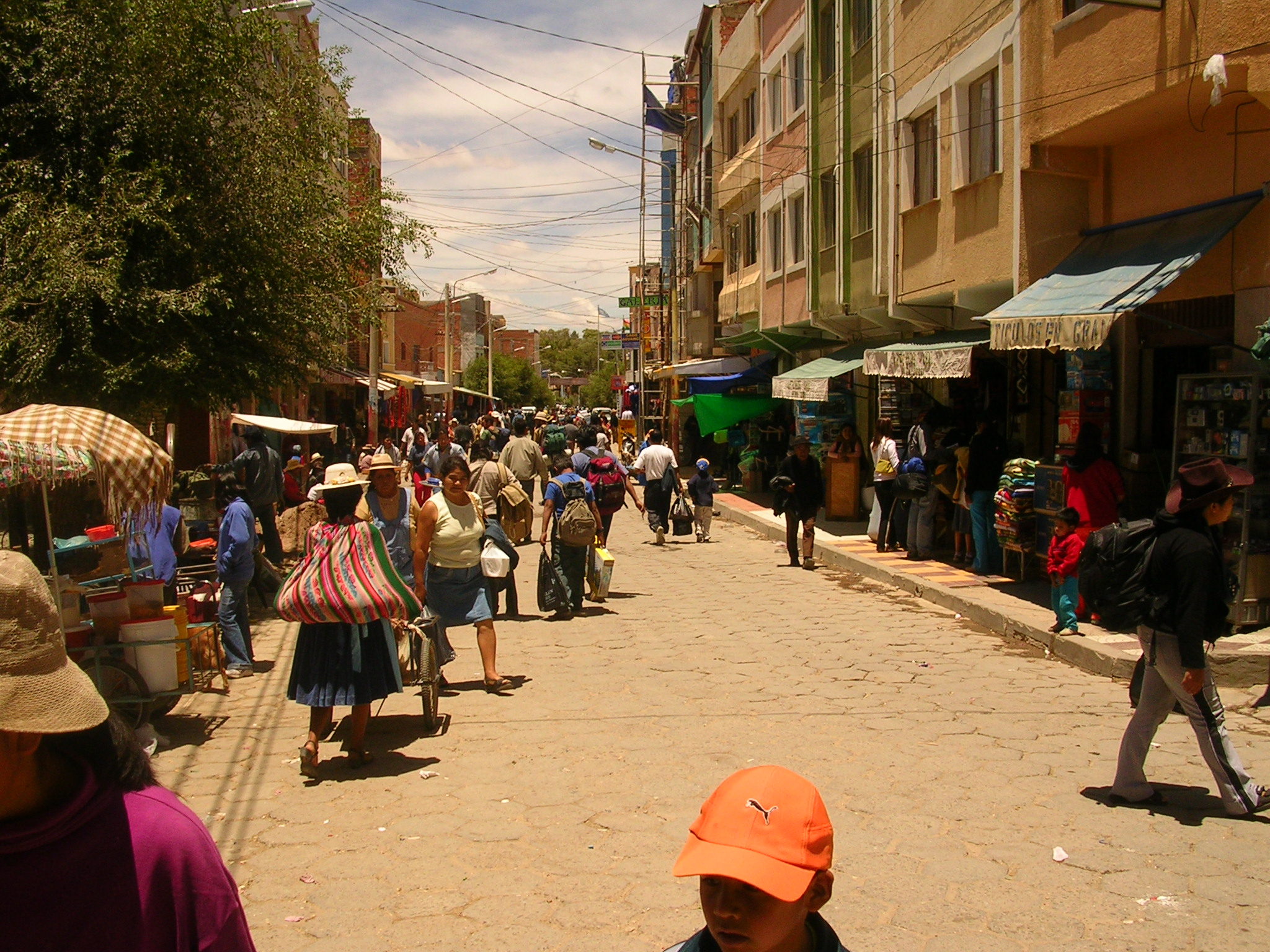

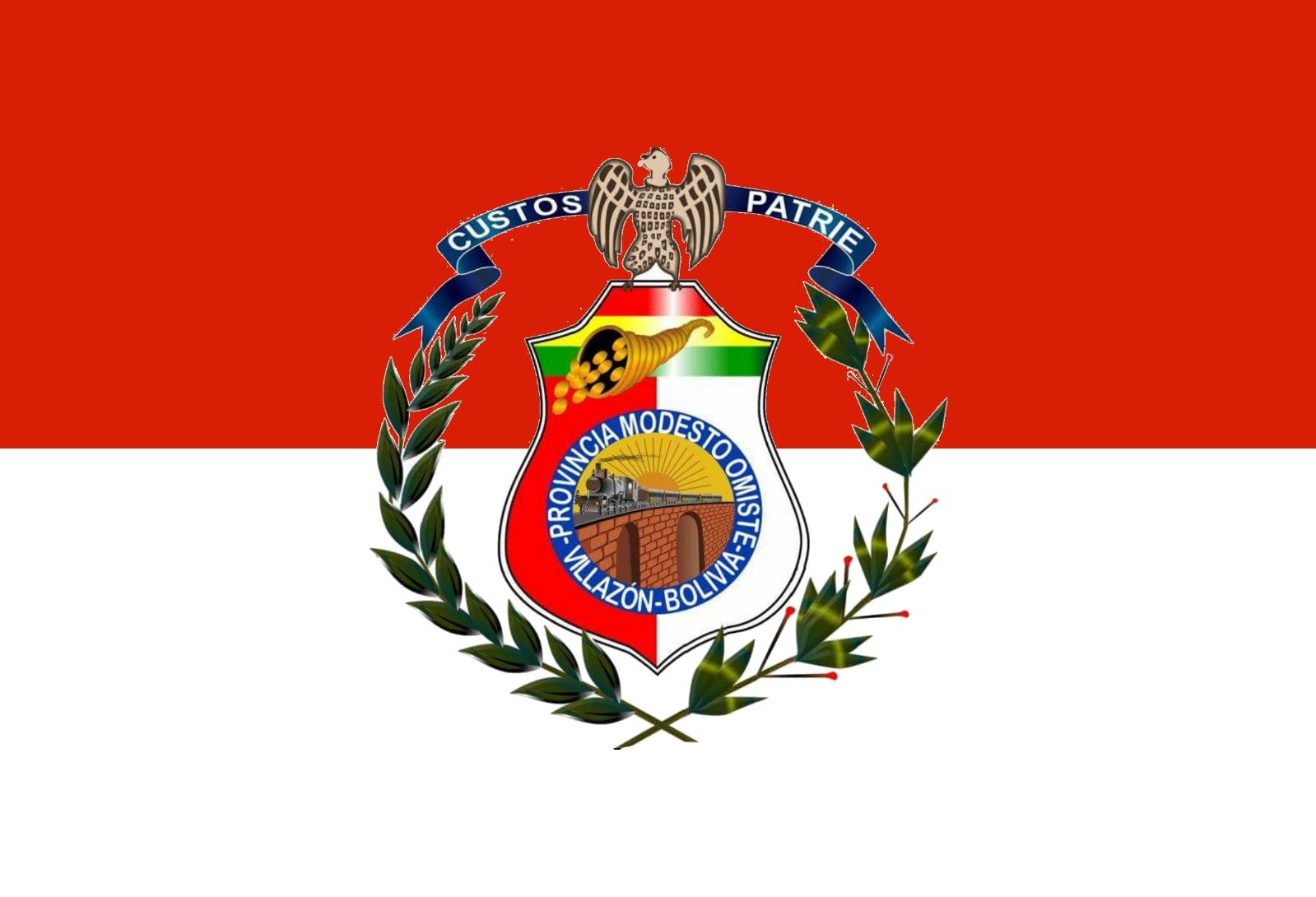
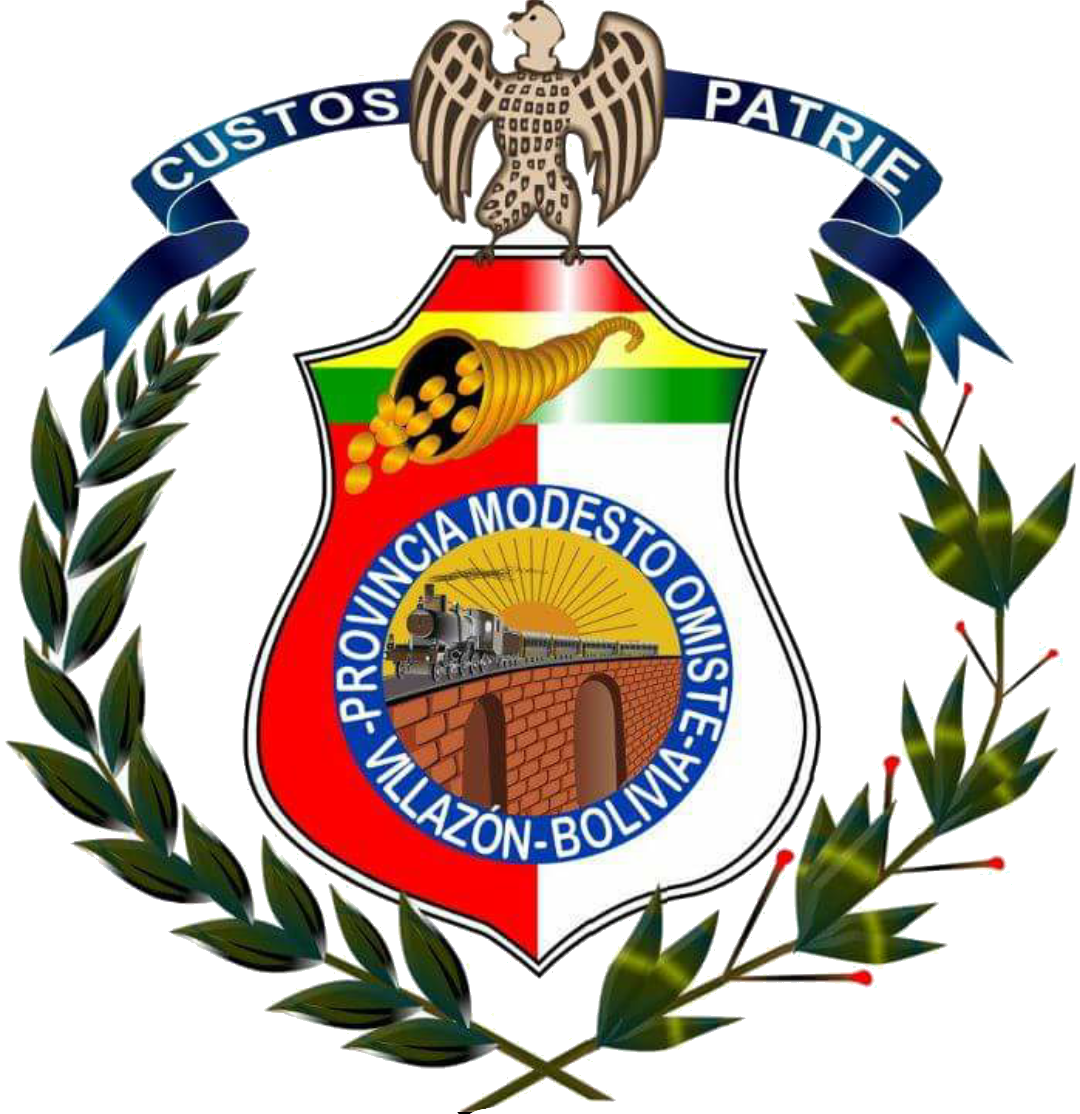
- Flag Seal

- Location in Bolivia
- Coordinates: 22°05′28″S 65°35′46″W
- Country: Bolivia
- Department: Potosí
- Province: Modesto Omiste
- Elevation: 3,447 m (11,309 ft)

Population (2012)
  - Total: 37,113
- Time zone: UTC-4 (BOT)
- Website: Official website

Villazón is a town in southern Bolivia, on the border with Argentina. It sits directly across La Quiaca River from La Quiaca in Argentina. The town is a busy trading hub, with large quantities of goods flowing north.

It is also a heavily used transit hub for tourists passing into Bolivia. A train line connects Villazón with Tupiza, Uyuni and Oruro. Two train services, the Expreso del Sur and slightly cheaper Wara Wara del Sur, each run twice a week. Buses also connect to many destinations.

== Climate ==
Climate data for Villazón/La Quiaca (1991–2020, extremes 1961–present)
Month	Jan	Feb	Mar	Apr	May	Jun	Jul	Aug	Sep	Oct	Nov	Dec	Year
Record high °C (°F)	27.7 (81.9)	28.8 (83.8)	28.0 (82.4)	25.5 (77.9)	25.2 (77.4)	22.4 (72.3)	21.7 (71.1)	24.5 (76.1)	27.2 (81.0)	27.4 (81.3)	28.5 (83.3)	28.6 (83.5)	28.8 (83.8)
Mean daily maximum °C (°F)	20.6 (69.1)	20.4 (68.7)	20.6 (69.1)	20.3 (68.5)	17.8 (64.0)	16.3 (61.3)	16.1 (61.0)	18.0 (64.4)	20.0 (68.0)	21.7 (71.1)	22.5 (72.5)	22.2 (72.0)	19.7 (67.5)
Daily mean °C (°F)	13.2 (55.8)	13.0 (55.4)	12.8 (55.0)	11.3 (52.3)	7.3 (45.1)	4.8 (40.6)	4.5 (40.1)	7.0 (44.6)	10.0 (50.0)	12.4 (54.3)	13.4 (56.1)	13.9 (57.0)	10.3 (50.5)
Mean daily minimum °C (°F)	7.7 (45.9)	7.6 (45.7)	6.6 (43.9)	3.1 (37.6)	−2.5 (27.5)	−5.7 (21.7)	−6.2 (20.8)	−4.0 (24.8)	−0.4 (31.3)	3.3 (37.9)	5.5 (41.9)	7.3 (45.1)	1.9 (35.4)
Record low °C (°F)	1.7 (35.1)	−0.1 (31.8)	−1.0 (30.2)	−7.9 (17.8)	−12.6 (9.3)	−14.6 (5.7)	−15.2 (4.6)	−14.8 (5.4)	−11.2 (11.8)	−6.3 (20.7)	−3.5 (25.7)	0.4 (32.7)	−15.2 (4.6)
Average precipitation mm (inches)	102.2 (4.02)	67.9 (2.67)	48.1 (1.89)	6.8 (0.27)	1.1 (0.04)	0.0 (0.0)	0.0 (0.0)	1.2 (0.05)	3.9 (0.15)	14.4 (0.57)	22.2 (0.87)	63.2 (2.49)	331.0 (13.03)
Average precipitation days (≥ 0.1 mm)	15.1	12.1	9.3	2.2	0.4	0.1	0.1	0.2	1.0	3.3	6.3	11.4	61.5
Average snowy days	0.0	0.0	0.0	0.0	0.1	0.0	0.1	0.1	0.1	0.1	0.0	0.0	0.2
Average relative humidity (%)	62.6	63.2	60.3	46.0	32.6	27.4	25.7	26.7	32.1	42.4	48.6	55.8	43.6
Mean monthly sunshine hours	263.5	228.8	269.7	288.0	297.6	285.0	297.6	303.8	291.0	306.9	303.0	275.9	3,410.8
Percentage possible sunshine	63.5	62.5	70.5	82.0	85.5	86.5	87.5	85.5	80.0	78.0	76.0	65.5	76.9
Source 1: Servicio Meteorológico Nacional (normals and extremes)
Source 2: Secretaria de Mineria (sun 1961–1990)

== Gallery ==
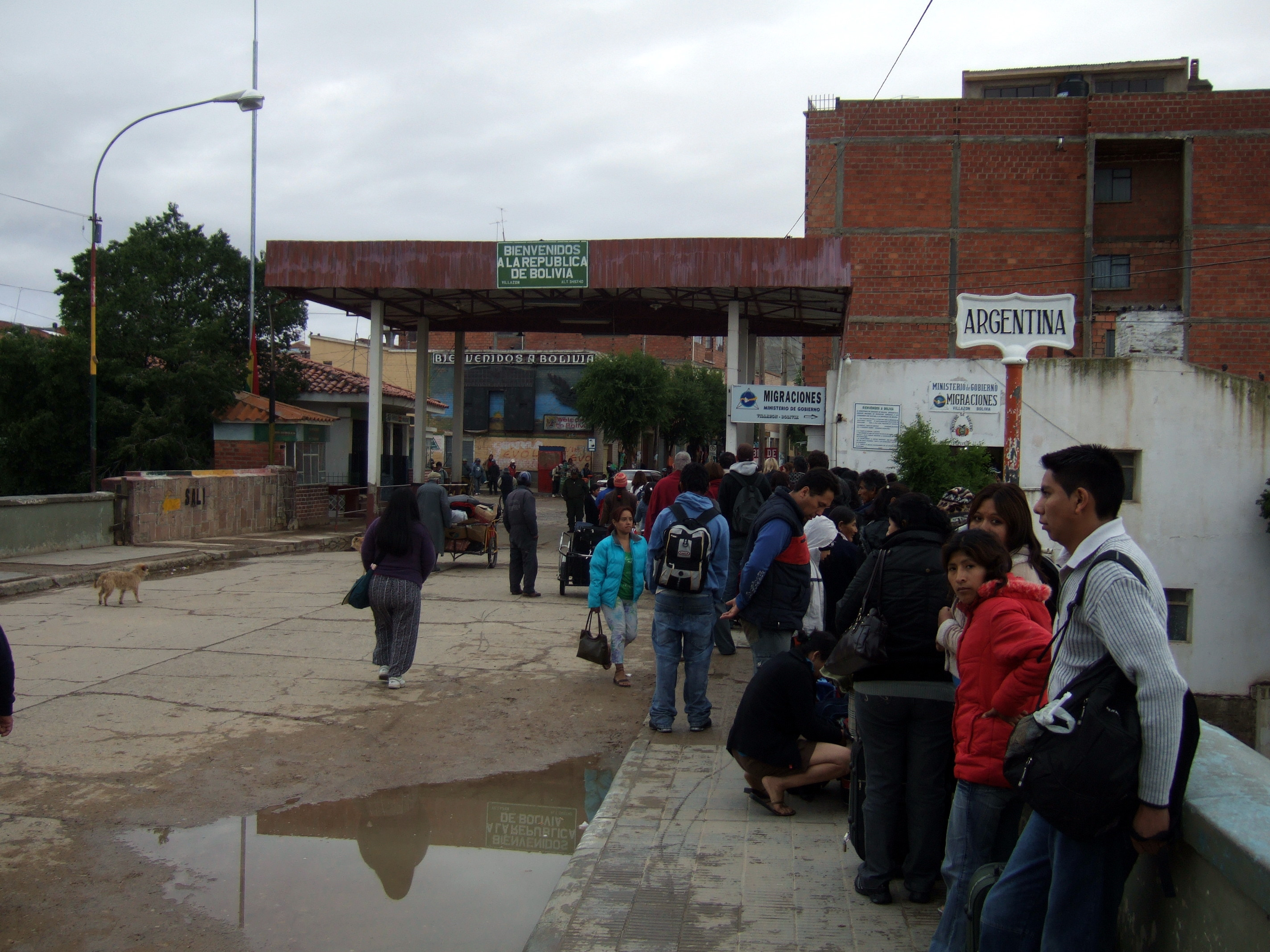
People queueing up to cross the border into Villazón

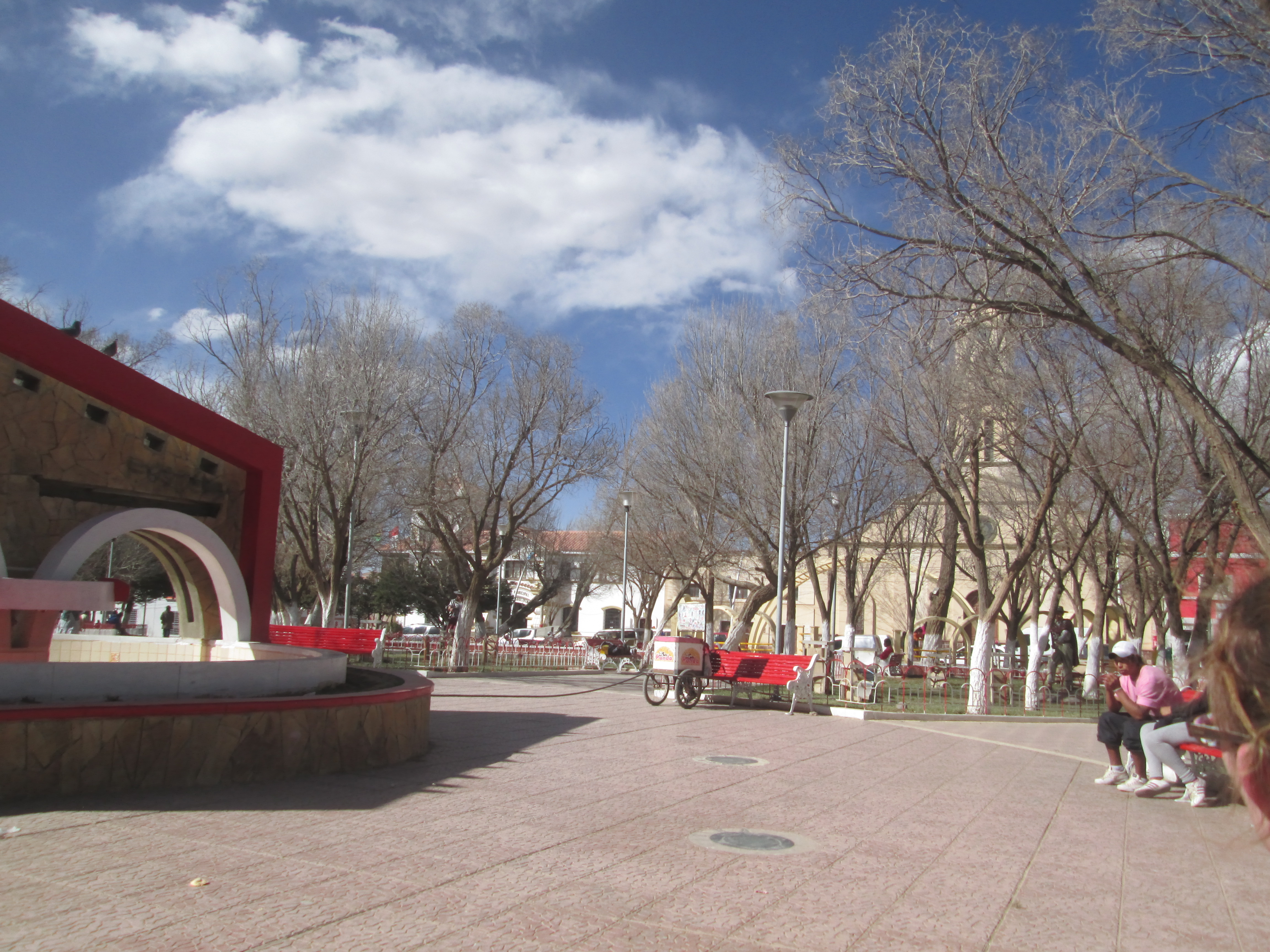
Town square in Villazón

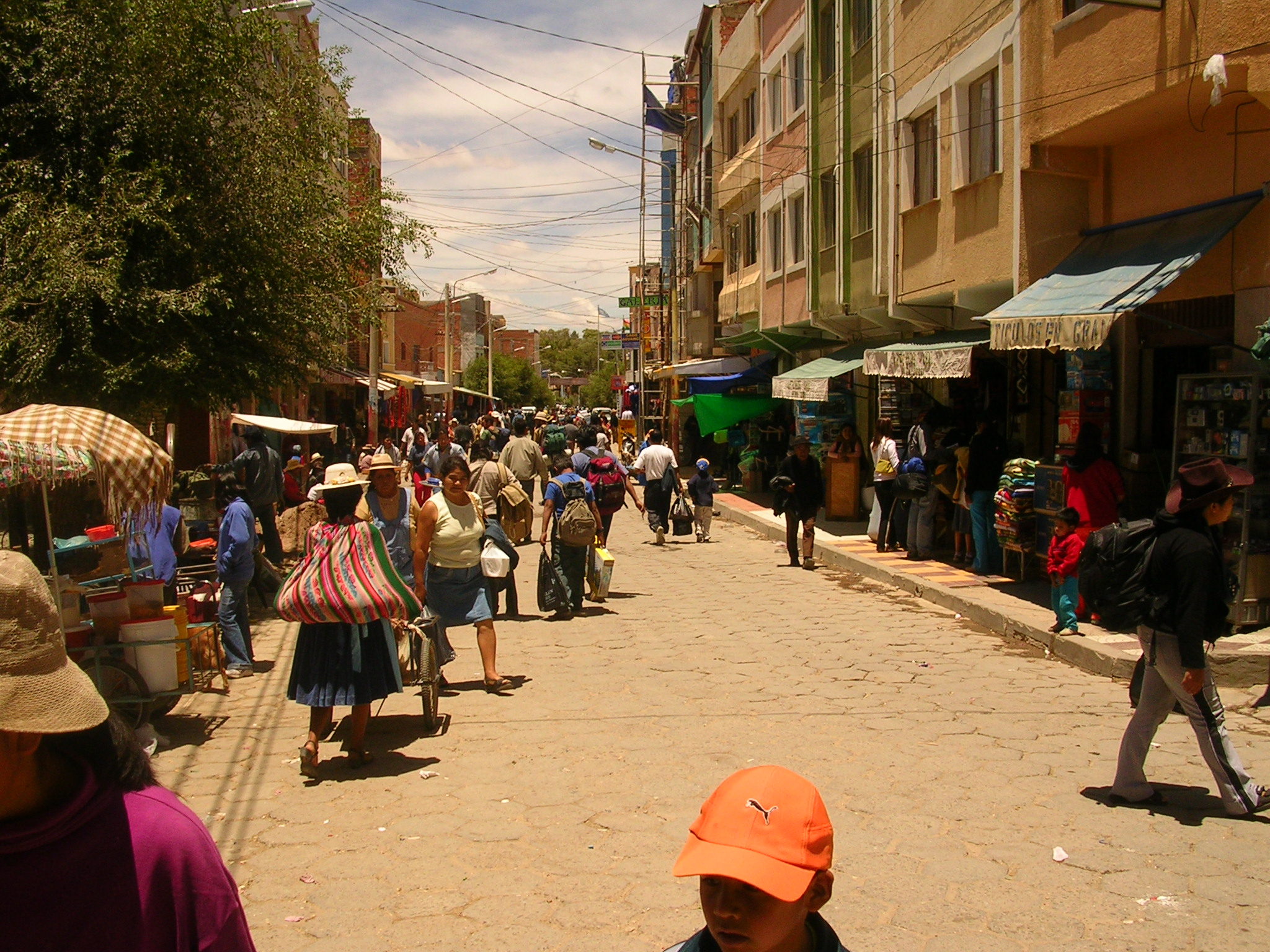
Una 2pintoresca peatonal de Villazón
