= Anta Department =

Anta
- Department
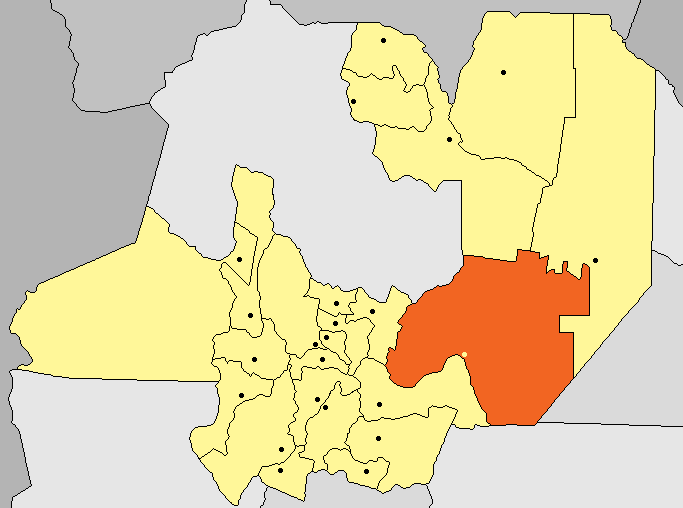
- Coordinates: 24°6′49″S 64°7′29″W
- Country: Argentina
- Province: Salta

Area
  - Total: 21,945 km^{2} (8,473 sq mi)

Population (2010)
  - Total: 49,841
  - Density: 2.2712/km^{2} (5.8823/sq mi)

Anta is a department located in Salta Province, Argentina. Its capital is Joaquín Víctor González.

With an area of 21,945 km^{2} (8,473 sq mi) it borders to the north with the departments of Orán and Rivadavia, to the east with Rivadavia and Chaco Province, to the south with Santiago del Estero Province, and to the west with the departments of Metán and General Güemes and with Jujuy Province.

== Towns and municipalities ==
- Apolinario Saravia
- El Quebrachal
- General Pizarro
- Joaquín Víctor González
- Las Lajitas
- Vinalito
- Tolloche
- Nuestra Señora de Talavera
- Macapillo
- Gaona
- Ceibalito
- Chorroarín
- Ebro
- Curva del Turco
- Santo Domingo
- Las Flores
- Las Flacas
- Luis Burela
- Coronel Mollinedo
- Palermo
- Río del Valle
- Centro 25 de Junio
- Coronel Olleros
- Piquete Cabado
