= Ledesma S.A.A.I. =

Argentine agribusiness and manufacturing company

Coordinates: 23.8275°S 64.79°W

- Type: S.A.A.I
- Traded as: BCBA: LEDE
- Industry: Food processing Paper milling
- Founded: 1908; 118 years ago
- Headquarters: Buenos Aires, Argentina
- Key people: Alejandro Blaquier, Director
- Products: Sugar; Paper; Gas & petroleum Alcohol fuel Beef; Fruit juice Syrup
- Revenue: ▲US$ 723.0 Million (2011)
- Net income: ▲US$ 49.8 Million (2011)
- Number of employees: 7,700
- Website: ledesma.com.ar

Ledesma (BCBA: LEDE) is a diversified agribusiness and manufacturing firm in Argentina. Its interests include food processing, fossil fuels, bioethanol production, and paper milling.

== History ==
Origins of the company can be traced to 1830, when the first sugar cane fields were planted by José Ramírez Ovejero González in Ledesma – a remote rural hamlet located in the San Francisco River valley, in Jujuy Province. His heirs established a sugar mill, powered with a steam engine, in 1876. The establishment, Ovejero Hermanos, was incorporated as Ingenio Ledesma (Ledesma Plantation) in 1889, and officially incorporated as Compañía Azucarera Ledesma in 1908.

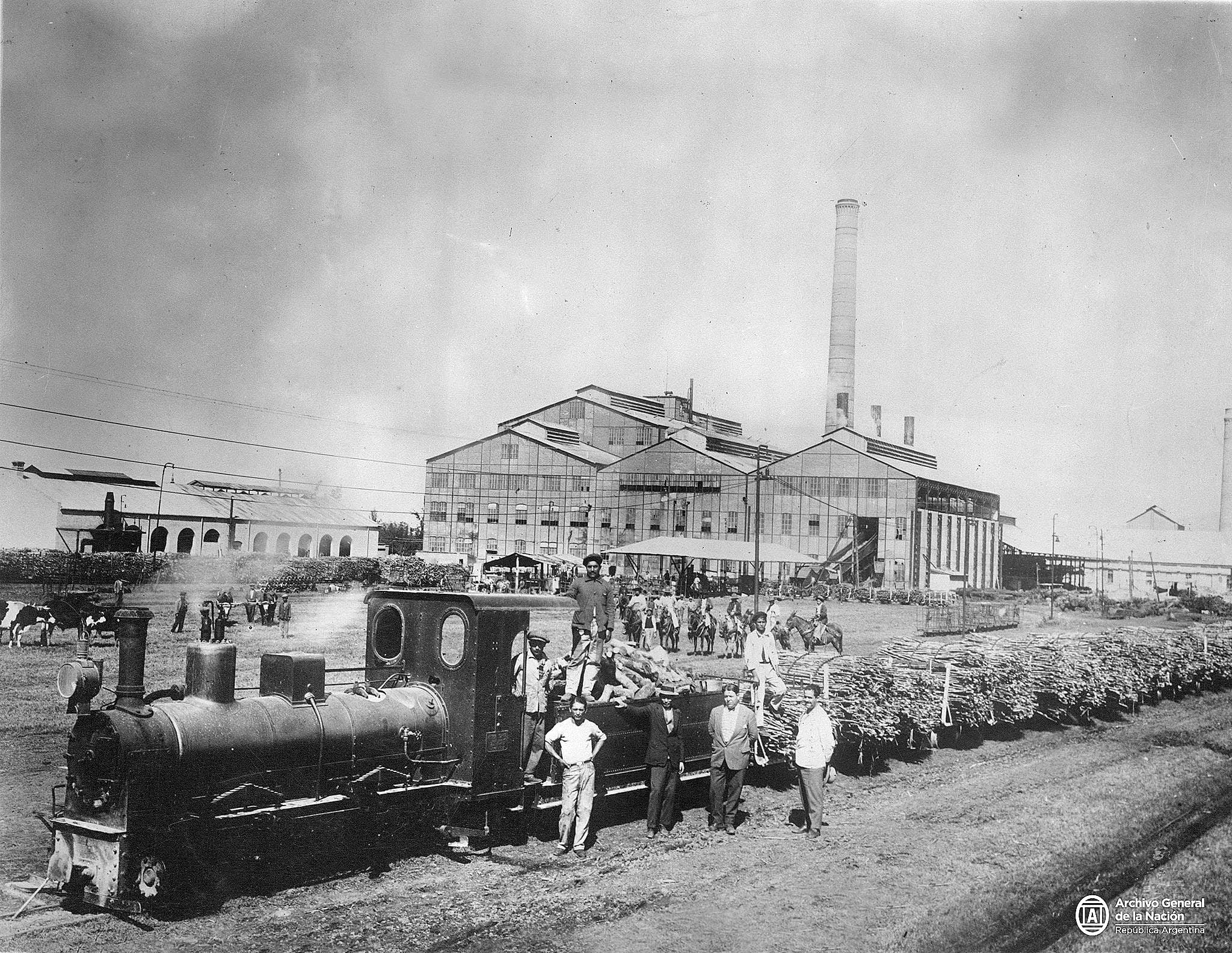
Ledesma sugar mill and railway line in Jujuy, 1910

The term Ledesma is in honor of Martín de Ledesma y Valderrama, who established the first defensive fort in the San Francisco River valley around the middle of the 17th century. He became the namesake of the Ledesma River and the Ledesma Department, as well.

Enrique Wollmann and Carlos Delcasse purchased the company in 1911, subsequently investing in technology and in increasing production capacity. Herminio Arrieta became president of the company in 1927. He fostered the growth of the company's sugar business by increasing land area under production and adding two sugar mills. Arrieta also diversified the company, establishing a cellulose and paper plant based on insourced sugar cane fiber.

The company was reincorporated under its present name in 1956. Carlos Pedro Blaquier became president of the company in 1970. Blaquier's tenure was distinguished by a marked diversification in the company's interests. He purchased numerous estancias in Entre Ríos and Buenos Aires Provinces (La Biznaga, La Bellaca, Magdala, and Centella), and incorporated the production of beef and cereals into the portfolio; purchased the Villa Mercedes, San Luis-based Glucovil in 1982, and established a wet-milling plant for the production of ethanol, corn starch and corn syrup; purchased extensive citrus fruit orchards in Jujuy and Salta Provinces, and in 1990 established a concentrate facility; opened a school supplies maker in Villa Mercedes in 1994; and established UTE Aguaragüe, a gas and petroleum producer, among other investments.

In July 1976, the company staged two blackouts, during which the forces of the ruling dictatorship, using company vehicles, kidnapped 300 to 400 political activists, trade unionists and other "undesirables", 55 of whom are still missing.

Alejandro Blaquier succeeded his father in 2007. His tenure was highlighted by the inaugural of a bioethanol plant in 2010. The following year, however, Ledesma was at the center of a controversy stemming from the illegal occupation of 15 hectares (37 acres) of land belonging to the company in Jujuy Province by 700 indigent families; following incidents during their eviction in August that resulted in four deaths, the Provincial Legislature expropriated 40 hectares (99 acres) of the company's land.

== Overview ==
Ledesma remains a leading Argentine agribusiness firm, with over 7,700 employees. Its facilities include:

- Libertador General San Martín (Ledesma):
  - Sugarcane plantations totaling 40,000 hectares (99,000 acres)res.
  - Fruit orchards totaling 2,000 hectares (4,900 acres).
  - Fruit packaging and fruit concentrate facilities.
  - Sugar, cellulose, and paper mills.
  - Alcohol and bioethanol facilities.
  - Installed electricity generation capacity of over 51 Megawatts (0.2% of the nation's total).
  - Roads totaling 600 km (370 mi) and irrigation canals of 1,400 km (870 mi).
- San Luis and Villa Mercedes, San Luis:
  - Glucovil Argentina S.A., a maker of milled corn products for the food processing industry.
  - Manufacture of notebooks, writing paper, and other school supplies. Paper production totals 105,000 metric tons annually.
  - Installed capacity of 7.5 MW.
- Salta Province:
  - Citrus orchards in Colonia Santa Rosa (800 hectares or 2,000 acres) and a packaging plant.
- Pampas:
  - La Biznaga, La Bellaca, Magdala, and Centella estancias for the production of beef and cereal (mainly maize). These holdings total 52,000 hectares (130,000 acres).
