= Quiles =

Quiles is a surname. Notable people with the surname include:

- Alberto Quiles (born 1995), Spanish footballer
- Antonio Jiménez Quiles (1934–2023), Spanish cyclist
- Diamilette Quiles (born 1985), Puerto Rican baseball player
- Eduardo Quiles (born 1940), Spanish playwright
- German Quiles (born 1939), American politician
- José Rodríguez Quiles, Puerto Rican politician
- Justin Quiles (born 1990), American singer
- Paul Quilès (1942–2021), French politician
- Ricky Quiles (born 1970), American boxer
- Waldemar Quiles (born 1940), Puerto Rican politician

== See also ==
- Copo Quile, village and rural municipality in Argentina
