= Cachi Department =

Cachi
- Department
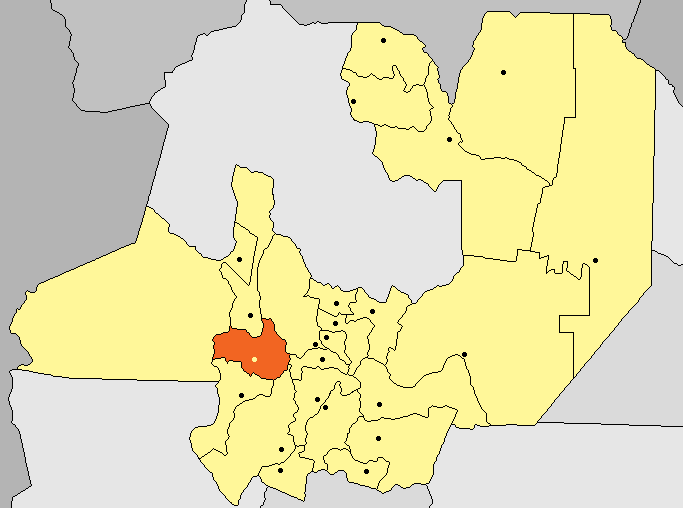
- Coordinates: 25°7′11″S 66°9′43″W
- Country: Argentina
- Province: Salta
- Capital: Cachi

Area
  - Total: 2,925 km^{2} (1,129 sq mi)

Population (2001)
  - Total: 7,280
  - Density: 2.49/km^{2} (6.45/sq mi)

Cachi is a department in the east of Salta Province, Argentina. Its capital is the town of Cachi. The total population was 2,189 as of 2015.

== Geography ==
Localities and places:

- Cachi
- Escalchi
- La Paya
- Payogasta
- Rancagua
- San José de Cachi
- San José de Escalchi
