= Luis Burela (mayor) =

Luis Burela y Saavedra
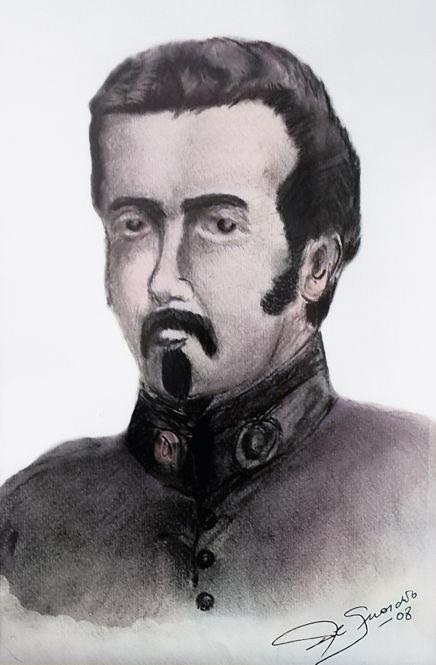

Personal details
- Born: August 24, 1779; Chicoana, Viceroyalty of the Río de la Plata
- Died: 1834; Chicoana, Salta, Argentina

Luis Burela y Saavedra was an Argentine landowner and soldier, who started the Argentine War of Independence in the northern provinces of Argentina, usually called the Gaucho War.

== Biography ==
In 1809 he was mayor of Salta, and the following year he supported the May Revolution like his brother Alejandro Burela, who joined the Salta Cavalry Volunteers. He collaborated with the advance of the Army of the North towards Upper Peru in that year and in 1813, providing it with numerous horses and mules, and capturing deserters. Shortly before the Battle of Salta he provided espionage and guerrilla services against the royalists.

In 1814 the second royalist invasion of Salta took place, between the second and third campaigns to Upper Peru. One Sunday in February, after mass, Burela gathered his countrymen, complaining about the depredations that the army of the royalist general Joaquín de la Pezuela carried out against the natives. He prepared to face them, and led an attack against a royalist forces, which he captured and took their weapons. With his gaucho and with those weapons he formed a large squad of militiamen, with whom he placed himself under the orders of the chief of an outpost of the Army of the North established in Guachipas, later Colonel Apolinario Saravia. That was the beginning of the so-called Gaucho War. He led the forces that besieged Salta and forced the royalists to withdraw.

His commander Martín Miguel de Güemes, a caudillo with much more experience, promoted him to captain. Starting in 1815, he served for a time under the orders of Alejandro Heredia with his band of gauchos. He supported the northward advance of the Army of the North, under the command of José Rondeau, and fought under Güemes in the Battle of Puesto del Marqués. He was left in charge of a garrison in the Quebrada de Humahuaca.

When Rondeau was defeated in the Battle of Viluma, he attempted to defend Humahuaca from the advancing third royalist invasion, and was taken prisoner. He remained in prison for almost a year. Shortly after, Juan José Feliciano Fernández Campero was also imprisoned, and he would not return. In 1816 he escaped from his captors and joined Güemes again.

In April 1817, he defeated the royalists in the battle of El Bañado, in which he destroyed half the enemy army, which had left Salta to gather supplies, and achieved the death of Colonel Sardina. This victory forced the enemy to evacuate Salta. In 1818 he was promoted to lieutenant colonel.

During all that time, he was one of the prominent leaders in the fight against the royalists, led by La Serna, Ramírez Orozco and Olañeta. He was seriously wounded during the defense of Salta in 1820.

In 1821 he accompanied Güemes and Heredia in their campaign against the governor – entitled "president" – Bernabé Aráoz, of the province of Tucumán, which ended in an absurd defeat. He was with Güemes when he died, and helped Vidt and Gorriti to expel Olañeta. He continued in the army, at least until the end of the war in Upper Peru, reaching the rank of colonel.

He later retired to private life, and devoted himself to rural tasks on his farm in Chicoana. Except for the revolution of 1827, in which he did not participate, that region was free from the civil war for a long time, and was not disturbed.

He died in Chicoana in 1834. He is buried in the La Plata Cemetery.

The town of Luis Burela in the province of Salta, commemorates him as the initiator of the Gaucho War.
