= Gaona, Argentina =

Gaona
- Municipality and village
- Location within Salta Province
- Coordinates: 25°14′29″S 64°2′14″W
- Country: Argentina
- Province: Salta Province
- Department: Anta Department
- Time zone: UTC−3 (ART)

Gaona is a village and rural municipality in Anta Department, Salta Province, northwestern Argentina.
