= Misión Kilómetro 6 =

- Municipality and village
- Location within Argentina
- Coordinates: 22°30′45″S 63°45′09″W
- Country: Argentina
- Province: Salta Province
- Time zone: UTC−3 (ART)

Misión Kilómetro 6 is a village and rural municipality in Salta Province in northwestern Argentina.
