= Campo La Cruz =

Coordinates: 22°29′53″S 65°05′49″W

- Municipality and village
- Interactive map of Campo La Cruz
- Country: Argentina
- Province: Salta Province
- Time zone: UTC−3 (ART)

Campo La Cruz is a village and rural municipality in Salta Province in northwestern Argentina. It had 136 residents at the 2001 census.
