= Luis Burela =

Coordinates: 24°22′S 64°02′W

- Municipality and village
- Interactive map of Luis Burela
- Country: Argentina
- Province: Salta Province
- Time zone: UTC−3 (ART)

Luis Burela is a village and rural municipality in Salta Province in northwestern Argentina.

The village is named after former mayor of Salta, and soldier Luis Burela.
