= Poscaya =

Coordinates: 22°27′18″S 65°04′48″W

- Municipality and village
- Interactive map of Poscaya
- Country: Argentina
- Province: Salta Province
- Time zone: UTC−3 (ART)

Poscaya is a village and rural municipality in Salta Province in northwestern Argentina.
