= Piquirenda =

Coordinates: 22°20′S 63°47′W

- Municipality and village
- Interactive map of Piquirenda
- Country: Argentina
- Province: Salta Province
- Time zone: UTC−3 (ART)

Piquirenda is a village and rural municipality in Salta Province in northwestern Argentina.
