= Claudio Acosta =

Argentine football striker

Personal information
- Full name: Claudio German Acosta
- Date of birth: February 12, 1988 (age 38)
- Place of birth: El Quebrachal, Argentina
- Height: 1.73 m (5 ft 8 in)
- Position: Striker

Team information
- Current team: Cañuelas

Youth career
- San Lorenzo

Senior career*
Years	Team	Apps	(Gls)
2005–2010	San Lorenzo	15	(0)
2009–2010	→ Juventud Antoniana (loan)	?	(11)
2010–2011	Almagro	37	(6)
2011–2012	Juventud Antoniana	?	(10)
2012	Colegiales	7	(0)
2013	Juventud Antoniana	17	(1)
2013	Gimnasia y Tiro	11	(0)
2014	Grakcu Sai Mai		
2014–2015	Sportivo Patria	32	(5)
2016–2017	Sportivo Desamparados	25	(1)
2017–2019	Juventud Antoniana	34	(2)
2020–2021	C.A.I.	7	(0)
2021	Sportivo Peñarol	22	(3)
2022–	Cañuelas	16	(1)

International career
2003	Argentina U-17	4	(0)
- * Club domestic league appearances and goals as of 18:39, 4 September 2022 (UTC)

Claudio Acosta (born 12 February 1988) is an Argentine football striker. He currently plays for Cañuelas in Argentina.

Acosta was part of the San Lorenzo squad that won the Clausura 2007 tournament.

== Titles ==
Season	Team	Title
Clausura 2007	San Lorenzo	Primera División Argentina
