= Centro 25 de Junio =

Coordinates: 24°57′29″S 63°51′14″W

- Municipality and village
- Interactive map of Centro 25 de Junio
- Country: Argentina
- Province: Salta Province
- Time zone: UTC−3 (ART)

Centro 25 de Junio is a village and rural municipality in Salta Province in northwestern Argentina.
