= Joaquín V. González, Argentina =

Coordinates: 25°05′S 64°11′W

Joaquín V. González
- Municipality and town
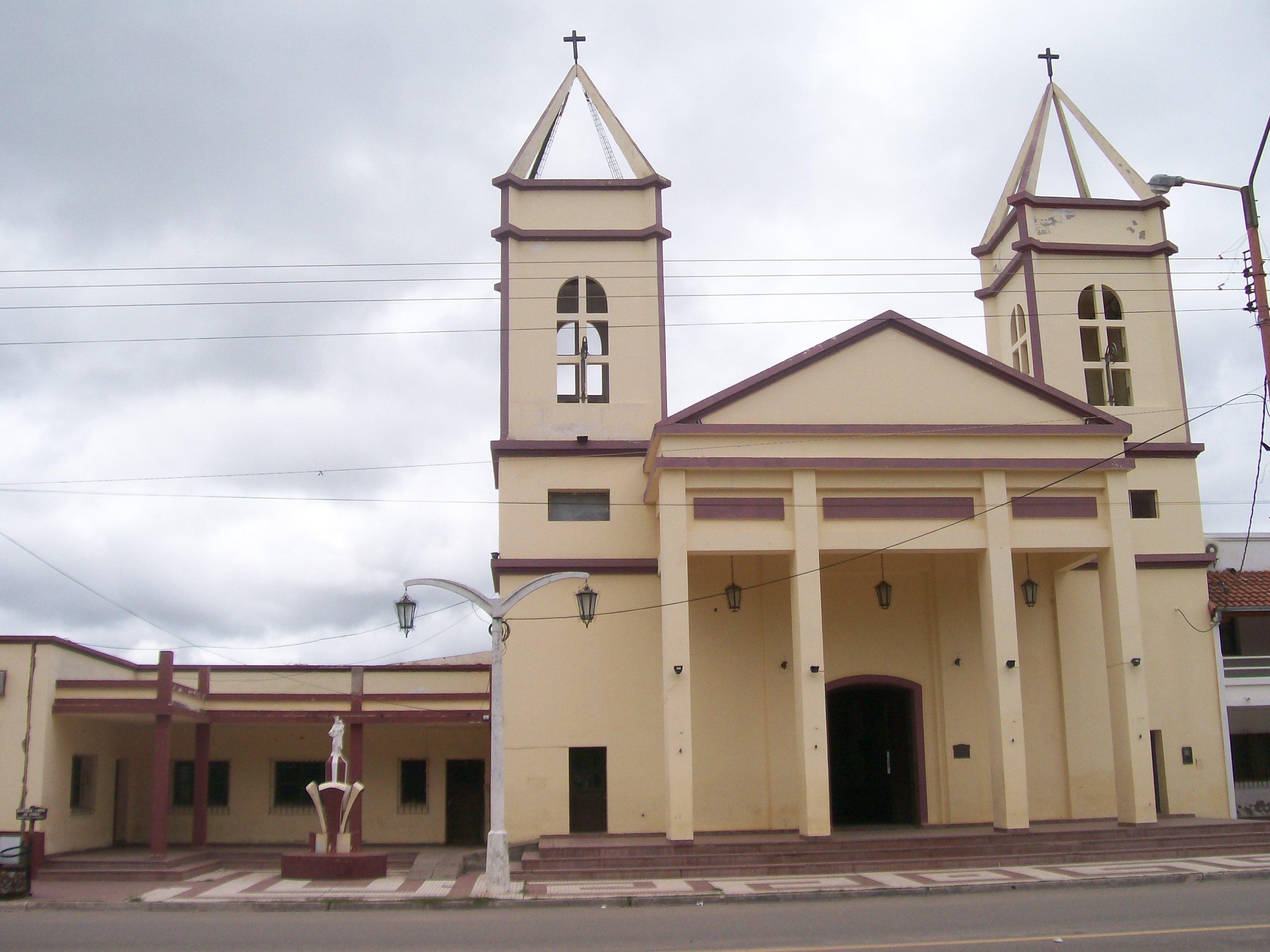
- A church in the town

- Flag
- Interactive map of Joaquín V. González
- Country: Argentina
- Province: Salta
- Department: Anta

Government
  - Type: Municipality
  - Intendant: Antonio Facundo Agüero (PJ)

Population
  - Total: 21,045
- Time zone: UTC−3 (ART)
- Climate: BSh

Joaquín Victor González is a town and municipality in Salta Province in northwestern Argentina. It is located in and is the capital of Anta Department. It was founded as Laguna Blanca (Spanish for White Lagoon) but changed to be named after Joaquin V. Gonzalez after a railroad was built in the area. Its industries are manufacturing of wood-based goods. Its population is 21,045 with 10,567 men and 10,478 women.
