= Diablillos mine =

Silver mine in Salta Province, Argentina

- Location: Salta Province, Argentina
- Products: silver

The Diablillos mine is a large silver mine located in the north of Argentina in Salta Province. Diablillos represents one of the largest silver reserve in Argentina and in the world having estimated reserves of 77.1 million oz of silver and 0.6 million oz of gold.
