= Tolloche =

Coordinates: 25°30′S 63°32′W

- Municipality and village
- Interactive map of Tolloche
- Country: Argentina
- Province: Salta Province
- Time zone: UTC−3 (ART)

Tolloche is a village and rural municipality in Salta Province in northwestern Argentina.
