= Luracatao =

Coordinates: 25°14′S 66°27′W

- Municipality and village
- Interactive map of Luracatao
- Country: Argentina
- Province: Salta Province
- Time zone: UTC−3 (ART)

Luracatao is a village and rural municipality in Salta Province in northwestern Argentina.
