= Urundel =

- Municipality and town
- Location within Salta Province Location within Argentina
- Country: Argentina
- Province: Salta Province
- Time zone: UTC−3 (ART)

Urundel is a town and municipality in Salta Province in northwestern Argentina.
