= Macapillo =

Coordinates: 25°22′S 64°01′W

- Municipality and village
- Interactive map of Macapillo
- Country: Argentina
- Province: Salta Province
- Elevation: 1,020 ft (310 m)

Population (2001 INDEC)
  - Total: 155
- Time zone: UTC−3 (ART)
- Postcode: A4452
- Area code: 03877

Macapillo is a village and rural municipality in Salta Province in northwestern Argentina.
