= Carboncito =

Coordinates: 23°19′S 63°57′W

- Municipality and village
- Interactive map of Carboncito
- Country: Argentina
- Province: Salta Province
- Time zone: UTC−3 (ART)

Carboncito is a village and rural municipality in Salta Province in northwestern Argentina.
