= Coronel Mollinedo =

Coordinates: 24°31′S 64°08′W

- Municipality and village
- Interactive map of Coronel Mollinedo
- Country: Argentina
- Province: Salta Province
- Time zone: UTC−3 (ART)

Coronel Mollinedo is a village and rural municipality in Salta Province in northwestern Argentina.
