= Las Costas =

Coordinates: 24°45′S 65°28′W

- Municipality and village
- Interactive map of Las Costas
- Country: Argentina
- Province: Salta Province
- Time zone: UTC−3 (ART)

Las Costas is a village and rural municipality in Salta Province in northwestern Argentina.

== Climate ==
Climate data for Las Costas
Month	Jan	Feb	Mar	Apr	May	Jun	Jul	Aug	Sep	Oct	Nov	Dec	Year
Record high °C (°F)	35.8 (96.4)	33.5 (92.3)	34.3 (93.7)	31.1 (88.0)	34.3 (93.7)	31.3 (88.3)	37.3 (99.1)	34.3 (93.7)	36.3 (97.3)	38.5 (101.3)	38.2 (100.8)	37.7 (99.9)	38.5 (101.3)
Mean daily maximum °C (°F)	27.0 (80.6)	25.7 (78.3)	24.6 (76.3)	22.2 (72.0)	20.7 (69.3)	19.2 (66.6)	20.0 (68.0)	21.8 (71.2)	23.2 (73.8)	26.4 (79.5)	27.0 (80.6)	27.6 (81.7)	23.8 (74.8)
Daily mean °C (°F)	21.1 (70.0)	20.0 (68.0)	19.1 (66.4)	16.1 (61.0)	13.2 (55.8)	10.4 (50.7)	10.5 (50.9)	12.5 (54.5)	14.9 (58.8)	18.7 (65.7)	20.1 (68.2)	21.2 (70.2)	16.5 (61.7)
Mean daily minimum °C (°F)	15.3 (59.5)	14.6 (58.3)	14.1 (57.4)	10.4 (50.7)	5.8 (42.4)	1.5 (34.7)	0.4 (32.7)	1.9 (35.4)	4.7 (40.5)	9.0 (48.2)	12.1 (53.8)	14.2 (57.6)	8.7 (47.7)
Record low °C (°F)	8.5 (47.3)	7.6 (45.7)	5.3 (41.5)	−0.3 (31.5)	−3.1 (26.4)	−6.6 (20.1)	−6.4 (20.5)	−5.9 (21.4)	−3.6 (25.5)	−0.9 (30.4)	1.7 (35.1)	6.1 (43.0)	−6.6 (20.1)
Average precipitation mm (inches)	209.6 (8.25)	168.3 (6.63)	133.3 (5.25)	40.1 (1.58)	6.8 (0.27)	3.0 (0.12)	4.1 (0.16)	6.0 (0.24)	6.2 (0.24)	29.1 (1.15)	68.1 (2.68)	140.6 (5.54)	815.1 (32.09)
Average relative humidity (%)	78	81	83	82	79	74	67	61	58	58	66	72	72
Mean monthly sunshine hours	182.9	155.4	133.3	123.0	151.9	156.0	195.3	201.5	189.0	207.7	189.0	198.4	2,083.4
Mean daily sunshine hours	5.9	5.5	4.3	4.1	4.9	5.2	6.3	6.5	6.3	6.7	6.3	6.4	5.7
Source: Instituto Nacional de Tecnología Agropecuaria
