= Nazareno, Salta =

Coordinates: 22°30′S 65°07′W

Nazareno (Salta)
- Municipality and village
- Interactive map of Nazareno (Salta)
- Country: Argentina
- Province: Salta Province
- Time zone: UTC−3 (ART)

Nazareno (Salta) is a village and rural municipality in Salta Province in northwestern Argentina.
