= Capiazuti =

Coordinates: 22°12′11″S 63°43′12″W

- Municipality and village
- Interactive map of Capiazuti
- Country: Argentina
- Province: Salta Province
- Time zone: UTC−3 (ART)

Capiazuti is a village and rural municipality in Salta Province in northwestern Argentina.
