= Campichuelo =

Coordinates: 23°06′S 64°01′W

- Municipality and village
- Interactive map of Campichuelo
- Country: Argentina
- Province: Salta Province
- Time zone: UTC−3 (ART)

Campichuelo is a village and rural municipality in Salta Province in northwestern Argentina. A 2010 census found the population to be around 340.
