= El Potrero, Salta =

Coordinates: 26°03′S 64°37′W

El Potrero (Salta)
- Municipality and village
- Interactive map of El Potrero (Salta)
- Country: Argentina
- Province: Salta Province
- Time zone: UTC−3 (ART)

El Potrero (Salta) is a village and rural municipality in Salta Province in northwestern Argentina.
