= Villa San Lorenzo =

- Municipality and town
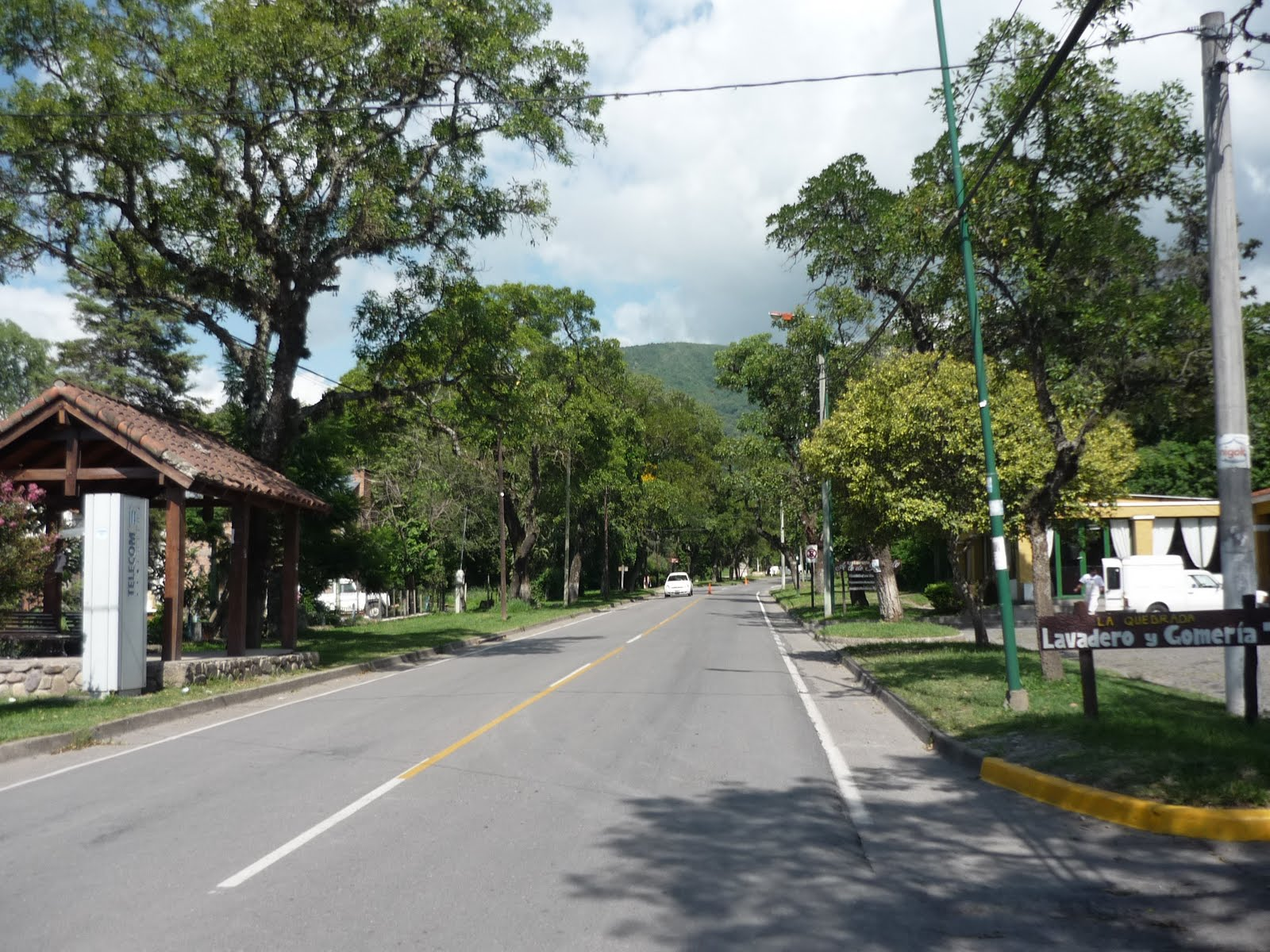

- Location within Salta Province Location within Argentina
- Country: Argentina
- Province: Salta Province

Government
  - Type: Municipality
  - Intendant: José Manuel Saravia
- Time zone: UTC−3 (ART)

Villa San Lorenzo, commonly known simply as San Lorenzo, is a town and municipality in Salta Province in northwestern Argentina.
