= Coronel Olleros =

Coordinates: 25°04′S 64°16′W

- Municipality and village
- Interactive map of Coronel Olleros
- Country: Argentina
- Province: Salta Province
- Time zone: UTC−3 (ART)

Coronel Olleros is a village and rural municipality in Salta Province in northwestern Argentina.
