= Apolinario Saravia, Salta =

Coordinates: 24°25′S 64°02′W

Apolinario Saravia (Salta)
- Municipality and town
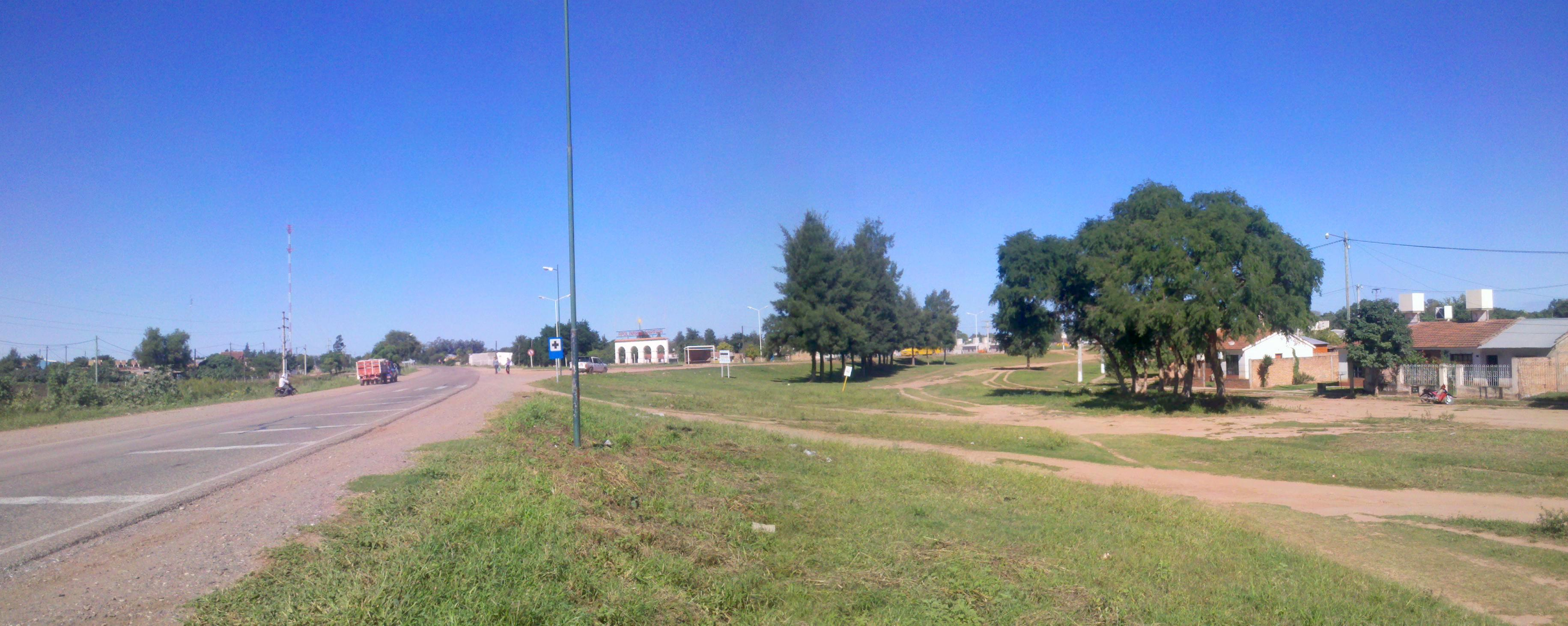
- Interactive map of Apolinario Saravia (Salta)
- Country: Argentina
- Province: Salta Province
- Department: Anta Department

Government
  - Type: Municipality
  - Intendant: Marcelo Daniel Moisés (PJ)
- Time zone: UTC−3 (ART)
- Climate: Cwa

Apolinario Saravia (Salta) is a town and municipality in Salta Province in northwestern Argentina.
