= Piquete Cabado =

Coordinates: 24°47′S 64°14′W

- Municipality and village
- Interactive map of Piquete Cabado
- Country: Argentina
- Province: Salta Province
- Time zone: UTC−3 (ART)

Piquete Cabado is a village and rural municipality in Salta Province in northwestern Argentina.
