= Pacará, Salta =

Coordinates: 26°54′S 65°08′W

Pacará
- Municipality and village
- Interactive map of Pacará
- Country: Argentina
- Province: Salta Province
- Department: General San Martín

Population (2001 INDEC)
  - Total: 148
- Time zone: UTC−3 (ART)
- Postcode: 4446

Pacará is a village and rural municipality in Salta Province in northwestern Argentina.
