= Ceibalito =

Coordinates: 25°05′S 64°19′W

- Municipality and village
- Interactive map of Ceibalito
- Country: Argentina
- Province: Salta Province
- Department: Anta
- Time zone: UTC−3 (ART)

Ceibalito is a village and rural municipality in Salta Province in northwestern Argentina.
