= Río del Valle, Salta =

Coordinates: 24°38′S 64°15′W

Río del Valle
- Municipality and village
- Interactive map of Río del Valle
- Country: Argentina
- Province: Salta Province
- Time zone: UTC−3 (ART)

Río del Valle is a village and rural municipality in Salta Province in northwestern Argentina.
