= Misión Tierras Fiscales =

Coordinates: 23°13′34″S 64°05′28″W

- Municipality and village
- Interactive map of Misión Tierras Fiscales
- Country: Argentina
- Province: Salta Province
- Time zone: UTC−3 (ART)

Misión Tierras Fiscales is a village and rural municipality in Salta Province in northwestern Argentina.
