= General Pizarro =

- Municipality and village
- Location within Salta Province Location within Argentina
- Country: Argentina
- Province: Salta Province

Government
  - Type: Municipality
  - Intendant: Franco Antonio Pérez (PJ)
- Time zone: UTC−3 (ART)

General Pizarro is a village and rural municipality in Salta Province in northwestern Argentina.
