= Colonia Santa Rosa =

Coordinates: 23°22′S 64°30′W

- Municipality and town
- Interactive map of Colonia Santa Rosa
- Country: Argentina
- Province: Salta Province
- Time zone: UTC−3 (ART)

Colonia Santa Rosa is a town and municipality in Salta Province in northwestern Argentina.

== Climate ==
Climate data for Colonia Santa Rosa
Month	Jan	Feb	Mar	Apr	May	Jun	Jul	Aug	Sep	Oct	Nov	Dec	Year
Record high °C (°F)	39.0 (102.2)	41.5 (106.7)	39.6 (103.3)	33.5 (92.3)	31.7 (89.1)	30.6 (87.1)	34.2 (93.6)	37.4 (99.3)	40.5 (104.9)	41.4 (106.5)	43.0 (109.4)	43.2 (109.8)	43.2 (109.8)
Mean daily maximum °C (°F)	31.8 (89.2)	31.4 (88.5)	29.2 (84.6)	25.9 (78.6)	23.5 (74.3)	21.0 (69.8)	22.3 (72.1)	25.3 (77.5)	27.3 (81.1)	31.1 (88.0)	31.4 (88.5)	32.0 (89.6)	27.6 (81.7)
Daily mean °C (°F)	25.8 (78.4)	24.9 (76.8)	23.8 (74.8)	21.1 (70.0)	18.0 (64.4)	14.7 (58.5)	14.3 (57.7)	16.8 (62.2)	19.5 (67.1)	23.6 (74.5)	24.7 (76.5)	25.9 (78.6)	21.1 (70.0)
Mean daily minimum °C (°F)	20.8 (69.4)	20.2 (68.4)	19.5 (67.1)	16.9 (62.4)	13.4 (56.1)	9.5 (49.1)	7.6 (45.7)	9.3 (48.7)	12.0 (53.6)	16.3 (61.3)	18.5 (65.3)	20.5 (68.9)	15.4 (59.7)
Record low °C (°F)	13.2 (55.8)	12.1 (53.8)	11.1 (52.0)	7.7 (45.9)	0.2 (32.4)	−2.4 (27.7)	−5.2 (22.6)	−4.4 (24.1)	0.4 (32.7)	3.9 (39.0)	5.6 (42.1)	14.0 (57.2)	−5.2 (22.6)
Average precipitation mm (inches)	196.7 (7.74)	165.6 (6.52)	152.3 (6.00)	89.9 (3.54)	13.4 (0.53)	6.2 (0.24)	6.3 (0.25)	7.3 (0.29)	10.1 (0.40)	37.8 (1.49)	102.9 (4.05)	161.9 (6.37)	966.5 (38.05)
Average relative humidity (%)	79	80	83	85	84	81	77	70	64	63	71	75	76
Mean monthly sunshine hours	207.7	175.2	161.2	120.0	130.2	120.0	167.4	179.8	168.0	186.0	174.0	201.5	1,991
Mean daily sunshine hours	6.7	6.2	5.2	4.0	4.2	4.0	5.4	5.8	5.6	6.0	5.8	6.5	5.4
Source: Instituto Nacional de Tecnología Agropecuaria
