= El Quebrachal =

Coordinates: 25°16′24″S 64°04′06″W

- Municipality and town
- Interactive map of El Quebrachal
- Country: Argentina
- Province: Salta Province

Government
  - Type: Municipality
  - Intendant: Rolando Rojas (PRO)
- Time zone: UTC−3 (ART)

El Quebrachal is a town and municipality in Salta Province in northwestern Argentina.

== Notable people ==
- Claudio Acosta, footballer
