= Copo Quile =

Coordinates: 26°01′S 64°40′W

- Municipality and village
- Interactive map of Copo Quile
- Country: Argentina
- Province: Salta Province
- Time zone: UTC−3 (ART)

Copo Quile is a village and rural municipality in Salta Province in northwestern Argentina.
