= Payogasta =

Coordinates: 25°02′S 66°06′W

- Municipality and village
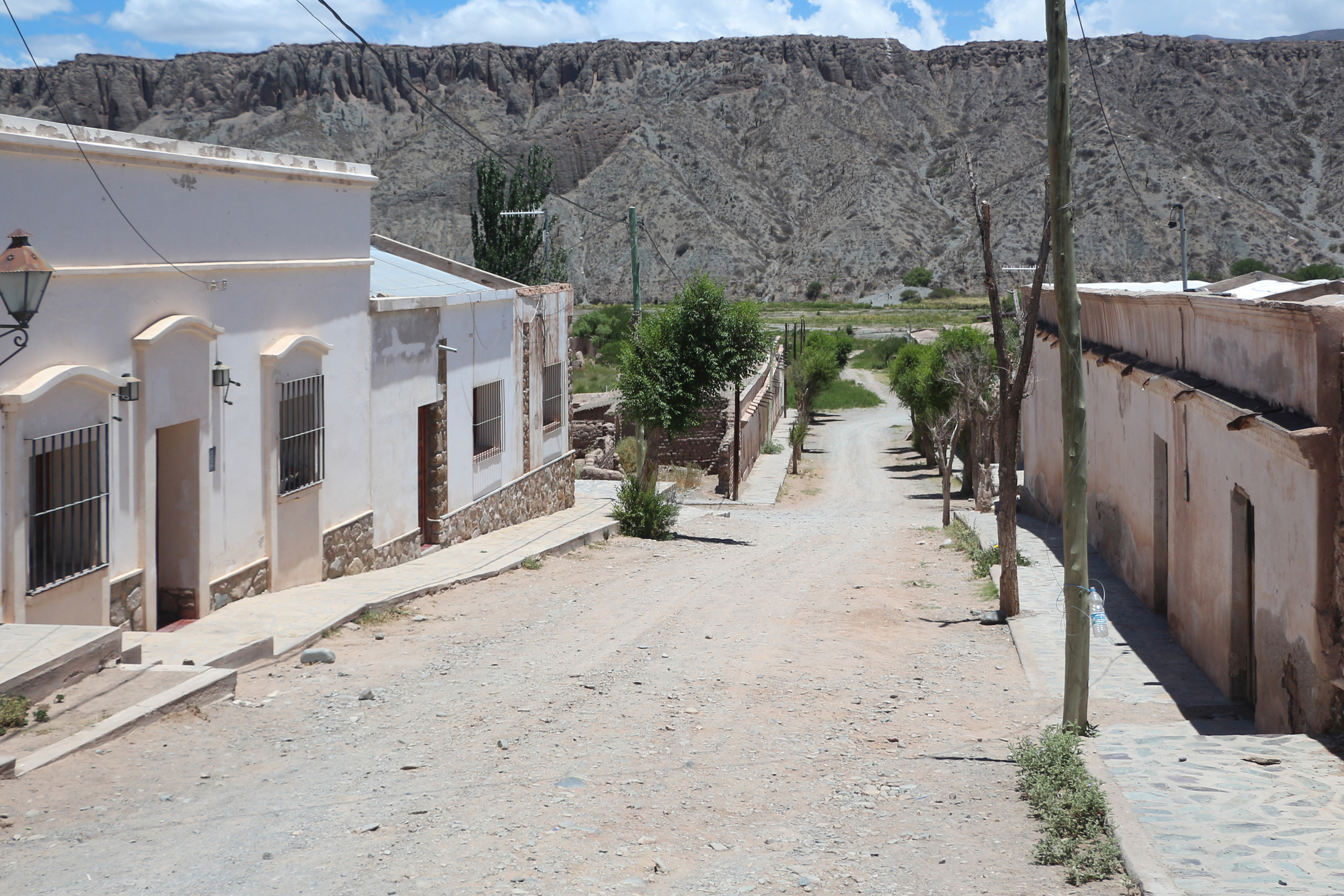
- Street in Payogasta
- Interactive map of Payogasta
- Country: Argentina
- Province: Salta Province
- Time zone: UTC−3 (ART)

Payogasta is a village and rural municipality in Salta Province in northwestern Argentina.
