= Salta Province =

Province of Argentina

Coordinates: 24°47′S 65°25′W

Salta
- Province
- Province of Salta; Provincia de Salta (Spanish)
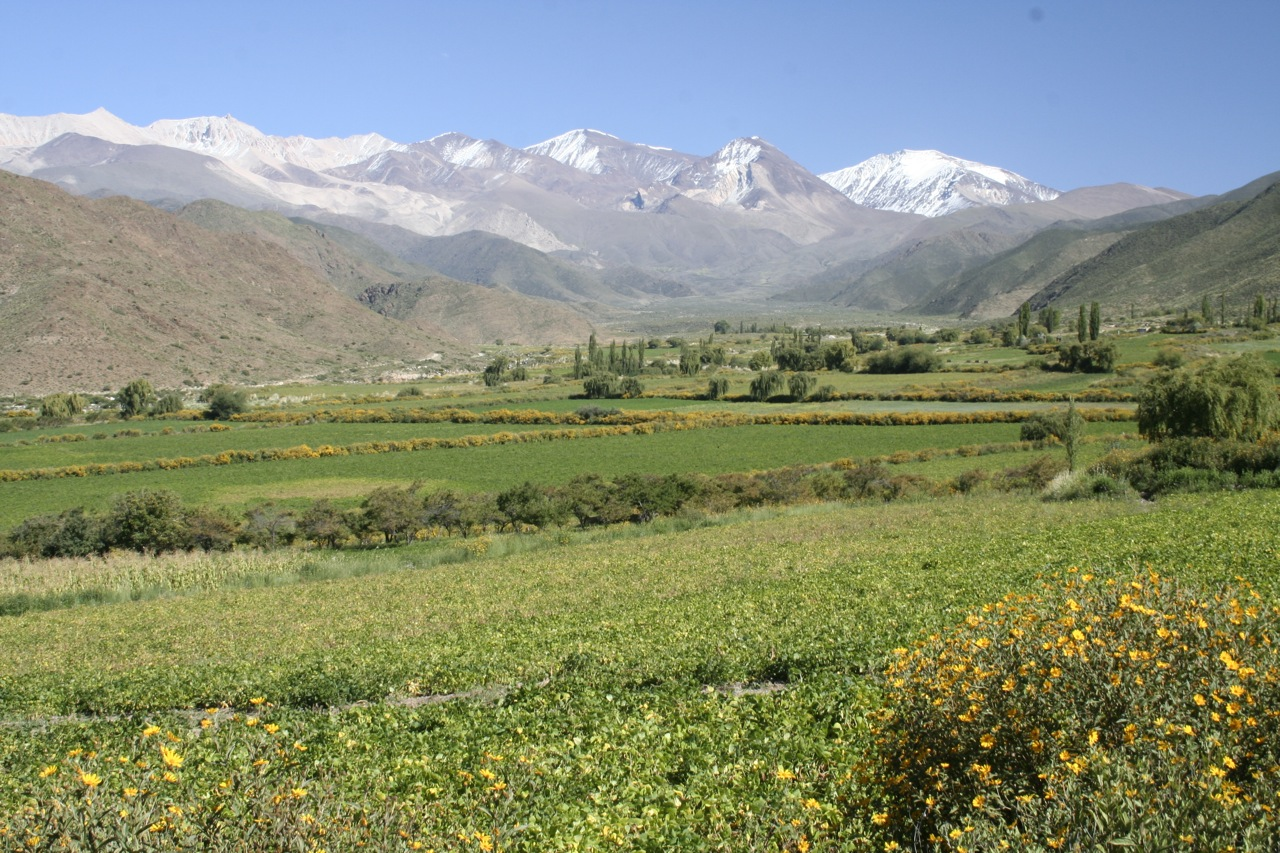
- The Calchaquí Valleys

- Flag Coat of arms
- Nickname: La Linda (The pretty)
- Location of Salta Province within Argentina
- Country: Argentina
- Capital: Salta
- Departments: 23
- Municipalities: 58

Government
  - Governor: Gustavo Sáenz (PAIS)
  - Vice Governor: Antonio Marocco (PJ)
  - Legislature: Chamber of Deputies (60); Senate (23)
  - National Deputies: 7
  - National Senators: Nora Giménez (FDT); Sergio Leavy (FDT); Juan Carlos Romero (JXC)

Area Ranked 6th
  - Total: 155,488 km^{2} (60,034 sq mi)

Population (2022 census)
  - Total: 1,440,672
  - Rank: 7th
  - Density: 9.26549/km^{2} (23.9975/sq mi)
- Demonym: salteño/a

GDP
  - Total: peso 31 billion (US$6.7 billion) (2012)
- Time zone: UTC−3 (ART)
- ISO 3166 code: AR-A
- HDI (2021): 0.844 very high (7th)
- Website: www.salta.gov.ar

Salta (Spanish pronunciation: [ˈsalta]) is a province of Argentina, located in the northwest of the country. Neighboring provinces are from the east clockwise Formosa, Chaco, Santiago del Estero, Tucumán, and Catamarca. It also surrounds Jujuy. To the north, it borders Bolivia and Paraguay, and to the west lies Chile.

== History ==
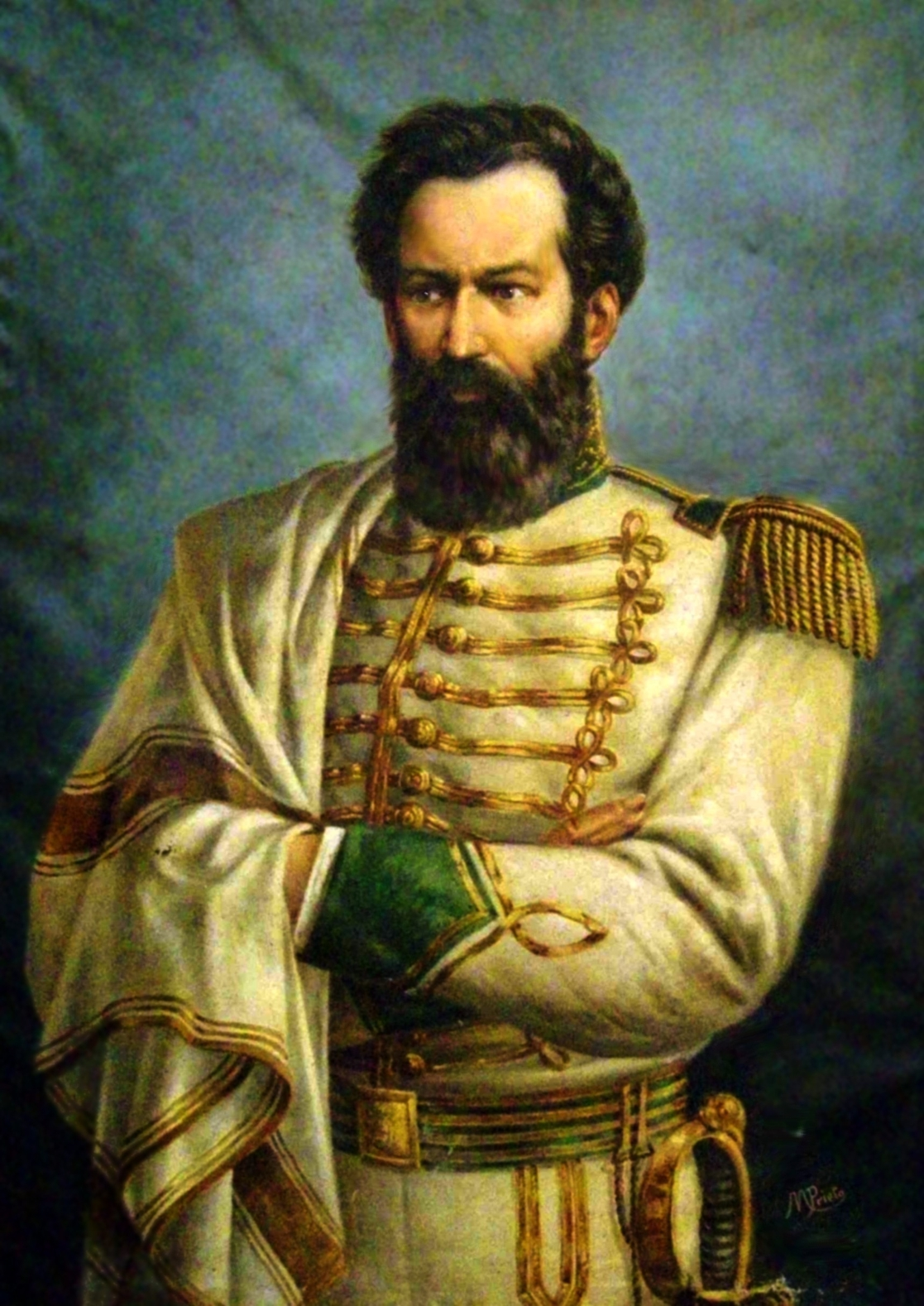
Martín Miguel de Güemes, a soldier and politician who fought in the Argentine War of Independence.

Before the Spanish conquest, numerous native peoples (now called Diaguitas and Calchaquíes) lived in the valleys of what is now Salta Province; they formed many different tribes, the Quilmes and Humahuacas among them, which all shared the Cacán language. The Atacamas lived in the Puna, and the Wichís (Matacos), in the Chaco region.

The first conquistador to venture into the area was Diego de Almagro in 1535; he was followed by Diego de Rojas. Hernando de Lerma founded San Felipe de Lerma in 1582, following orders of the viceroy Francisco de Toledo, Count of Oropesa; the name of the city was soon changed to "San Felipe de Salta". By 1650, the city had around five hundred inhabitants.

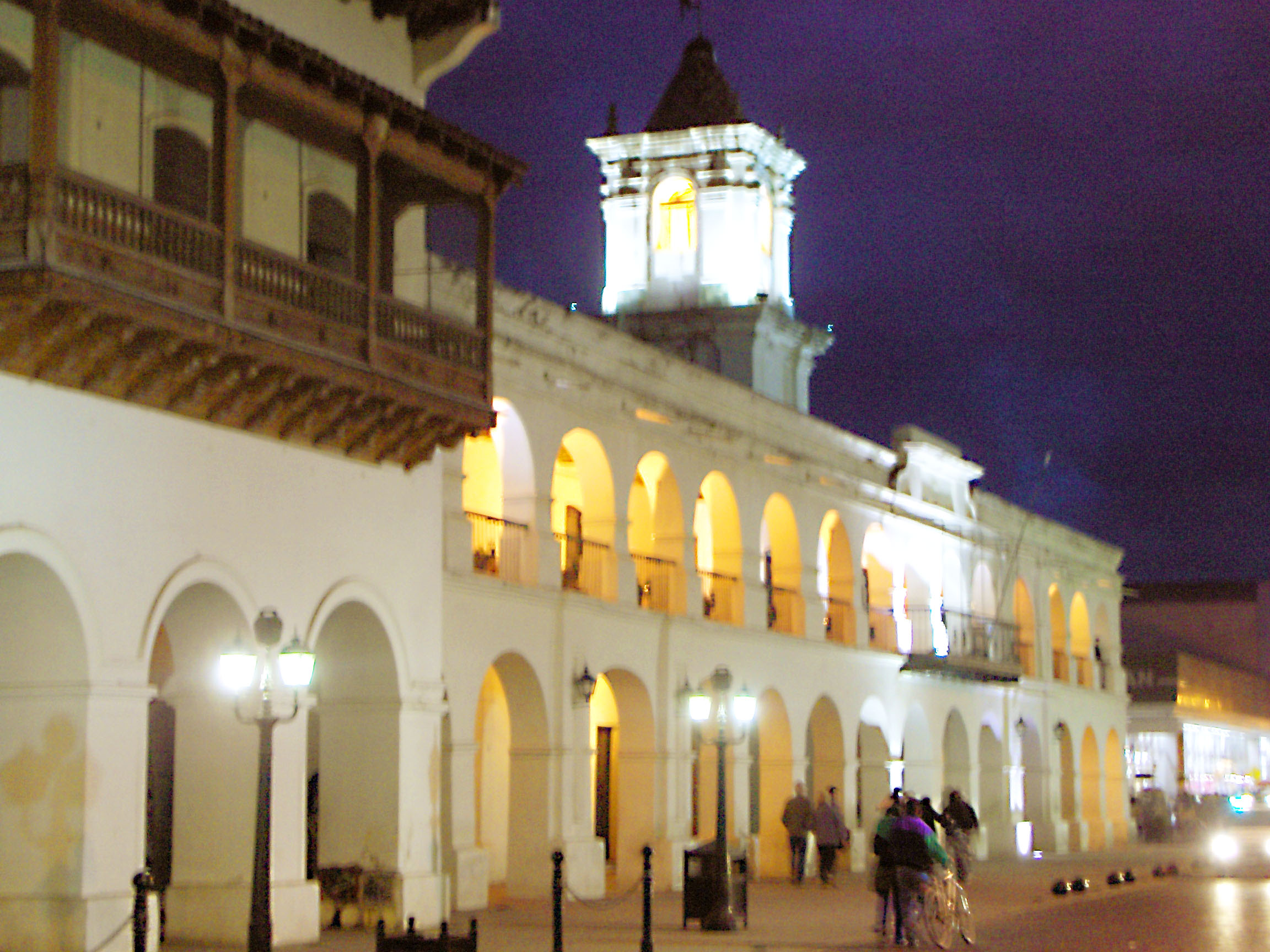
Colonial Cabildo in the city of Salta.

An intendency of "Salta del Tucumán" was created within the Viceroyalty of the Río de la Plata. In 1774, San Ramón de La Nueva Orán was founded between Salta and Tarija (Tarija was added to the intendency later, in 1807). In 1783, in recognition of the growing importance of the city, the capital of the intendency of Salta del Tucumán was moved from San Miguel de Tucumán to Salta.

The battle of Salta in 1813 freed the territory from Spain, but occasional attacks were mounted from the Viceroyalty of Peru as late as 1826. Gervasio de Posadas created the province of Salta in 1814, containing the current provinces of Salta, Jujuy, and parts of southern Bolivia and northern Chile.

Exploiting internal Argentine conflicts that arose after the Argentine Declaration of Independence, Bolivia annexed Tarija in 1826. In 1834, Jujuy withdrew from Salta and became a separate province. The borders of Salta were further reduced in 1900, with the loss of Yacuiba to Bolivia.

The National Government of Los Andes, constituted from the province in 1902 with a capital at San Antonio de los Cobres, was returned to Salta Province in 1943 as the Department of Los Andes.

Antonio Alice's painting, La muerte de Güemes, which received a gold medal at the Centenary Exposition, is on display at the offices of the Salta Provincial Government.

== Geography ==
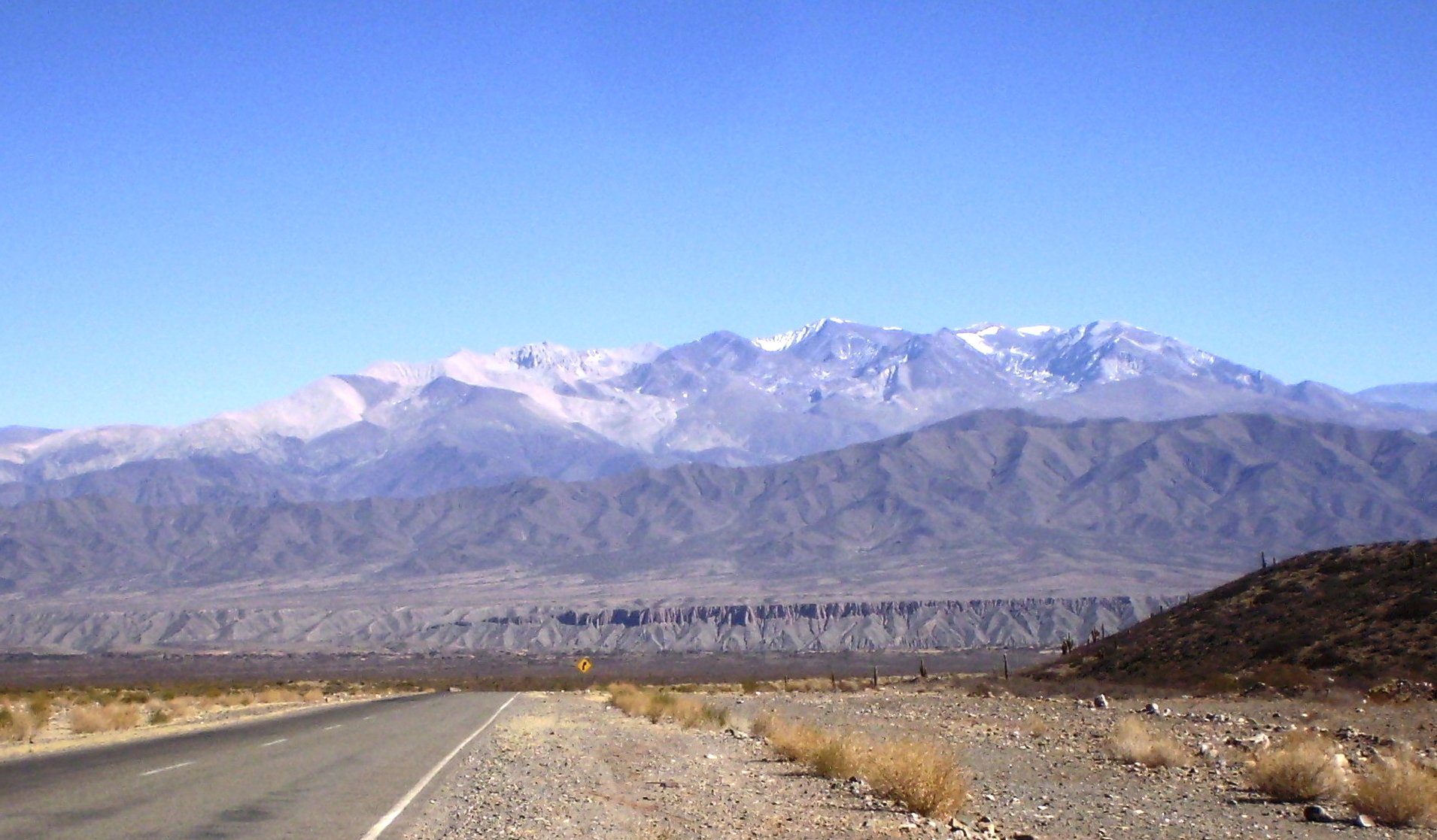
View of Nevado de Cachi.

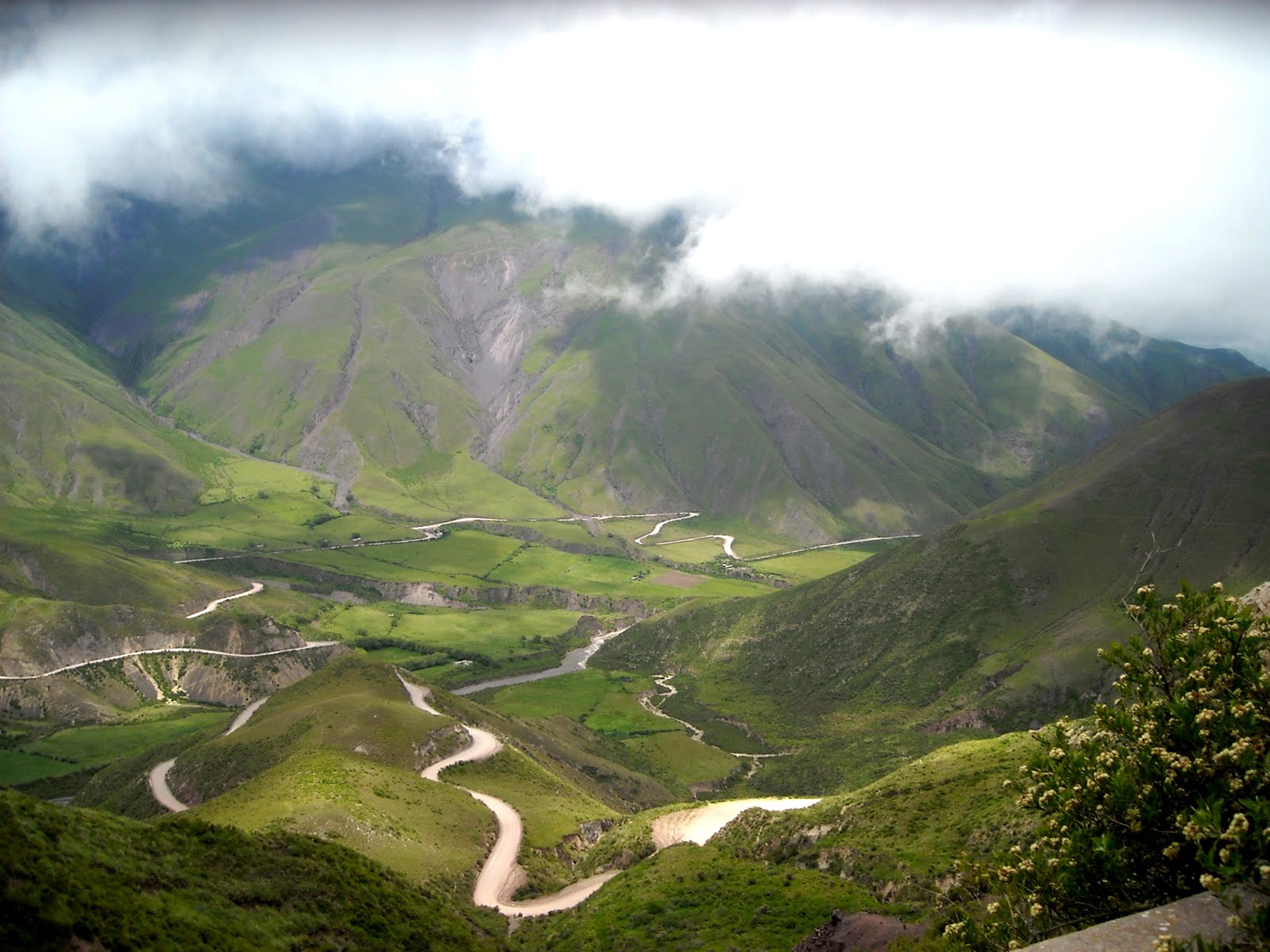
View of the Cuesta del Obispo.

The total land area of the province is 155,488 km^{2} (60,034 sq mi), making it the sixth largest province by area in Argentina. The main rivers of the province are the Pilcomayo, Bermejo, and the Juramento, which later becomes the Salado River. Salta Province is located at a geologically active region, and suffers from occasional earthquakes. There have been four earthquakes of note in the province:

- In 1692, registering 7.0 on the Richter magnitude scale, and at IX (Violent) on the Mercalli intensity scale,
- In 1844, registering 6.5 on the Richter magnitude scale, and VII (Very strong) Mercalli intensity,
- In 1948, registering 7.0 on the Moment magnitude scale (MMS), and IX (Violent) Mercalli intensity, and
- In 2010, registering 6.1 or 6.3 (MMS), and VI (Strong) Mercalli intensity.

The 1692 earthquake was the inspiration for Salta's annual citywide festival, held on 16 September, in honor of El Señor y la Virgen del Milagro.

=== Climate ===
Köppen climate map of Salta, Argentina

Although Salta Province is located near the Tropic of Capricorn, it has a wide range of climates due to variation in altitude and the influence of orography. The orientation of the Andes influences the distribution of precipitation within the province.

The easternmost parts of the province have a hot semi-arid climate (Köppen BSh) with a rainy season in the summer. The mean annual temperature and precipitation are 20 °C (68.0 °F) and 500 millimetres (19.7 in). Temperatures can reach up to 47 °C or 116.6 °F during summer, while they can fall down to −5 °C or 23 °F during winter.

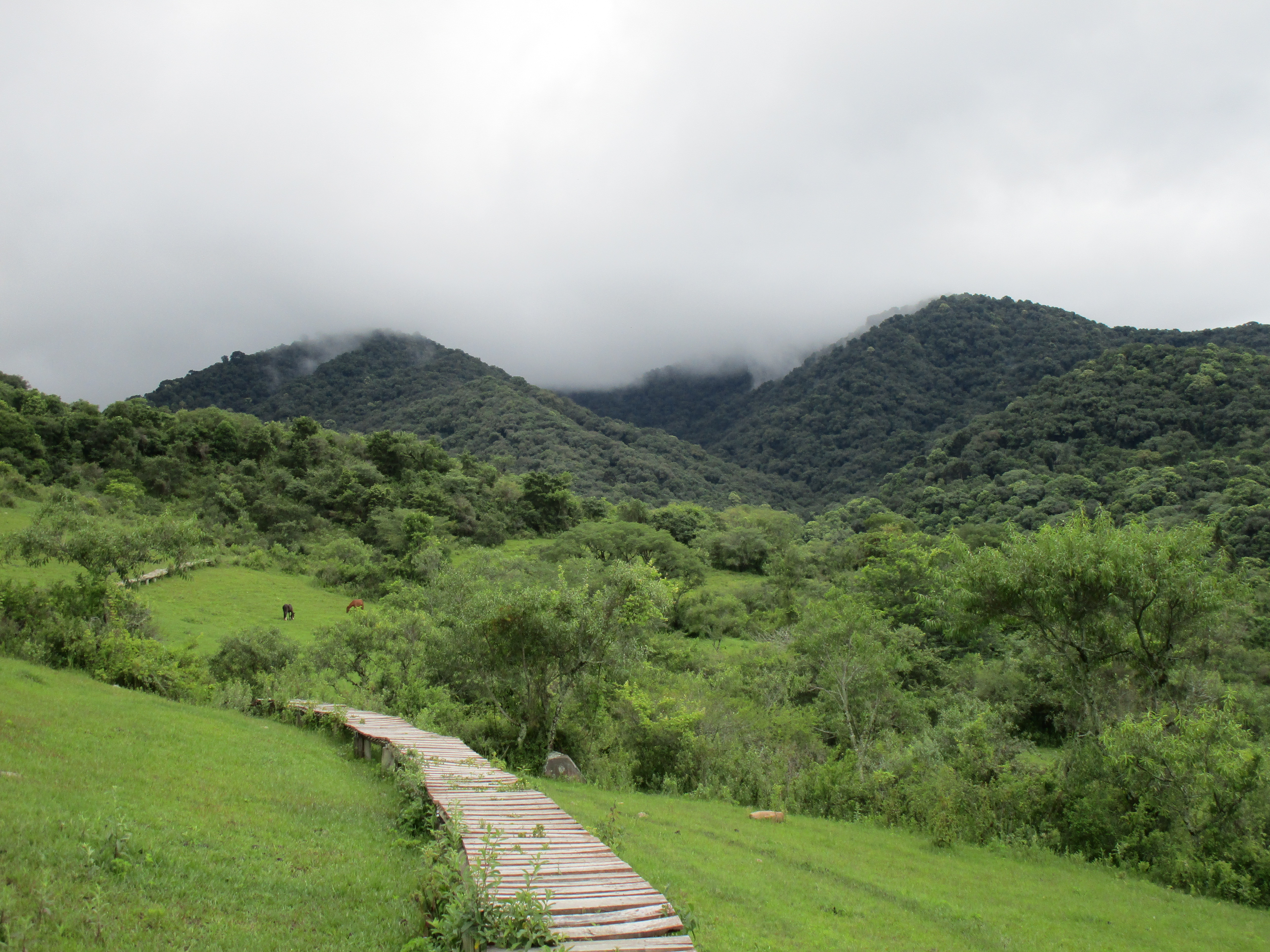
View of the Southern Andean Yungas in Villa San Lorenzo.

The first slopes of the Andes force the moist, easterly winds to rise, provoking very high condensation leading to the formation of clouds that generate copious amounts of rain. The eastern slopes of the mountains receive between 1,000 to 1,500 mm (39 to 59 in) of precipitation a year, although some places receive up to 2,500 mm (98 in) of precipitation annually owing to orographic precipitation. Most of the precipitation is concentrated in the summer, with winters being dry. The high rainfall on these first slopes creates a thick jungle that extends in a narrow strip along these ranges, creating an area of great species diversity. At higher altitudes on these slopes, the climate is cooler and more humid, with the vegetation consisting of deciduous and pine trees.

Between the high altitudes to the west and the low plains to the east lie the valleys. The climate of these valleys is either humid subtropical with dry winters (Köppen Cwa) or subtropical highland (Cwb), favouring human settlement and agricultural activities. Mean annual precipitation is around 1,000 mm (39 in), most of it during summer. Mean temperatures exceed 20 °C (68.0 °F) during the summer, while during winter, they are below 14 °C (57.2 °F).

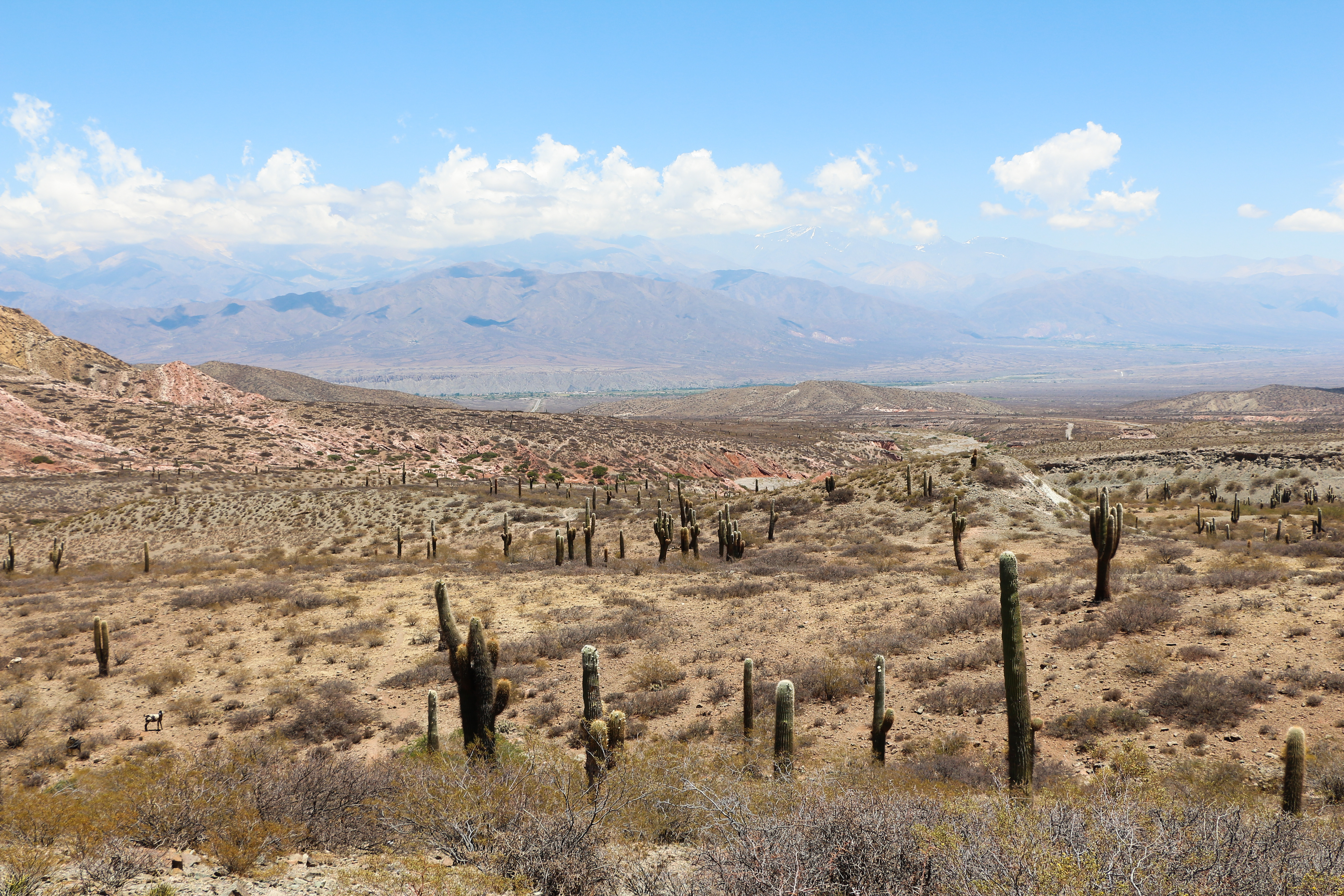
The High Monte landscape in Los Cardones National Park.

Further west, the Altiplano is a plateau at 3,000 to 4,000 metres (9,800 to 13,100 ft) above sea level. This region has a cool semi-arid climate (Köppen BSk): high temperatures vary little (since the warmer season is cloudy, and the cooler sunny), ranging from 14 to 21 °C or 57.2 to 69.8 °F; night temperatures go from 6 °C or 42.8 °F in midsummer, to −8 °C or 17.6 °F in midwinter, and extremes under −15 °C or 5 °F might be recorded. All rain falls exclusively in the summer, with annual totals between 200 and 400 millimetres or 8 and 16 inches. Several salt flats exist in this area.

The highest altitudes found in the western parts of the province have a cool arid climate (Köppen BWk), with large diurnal ranges (temperature range between day and night).

== Economy ==
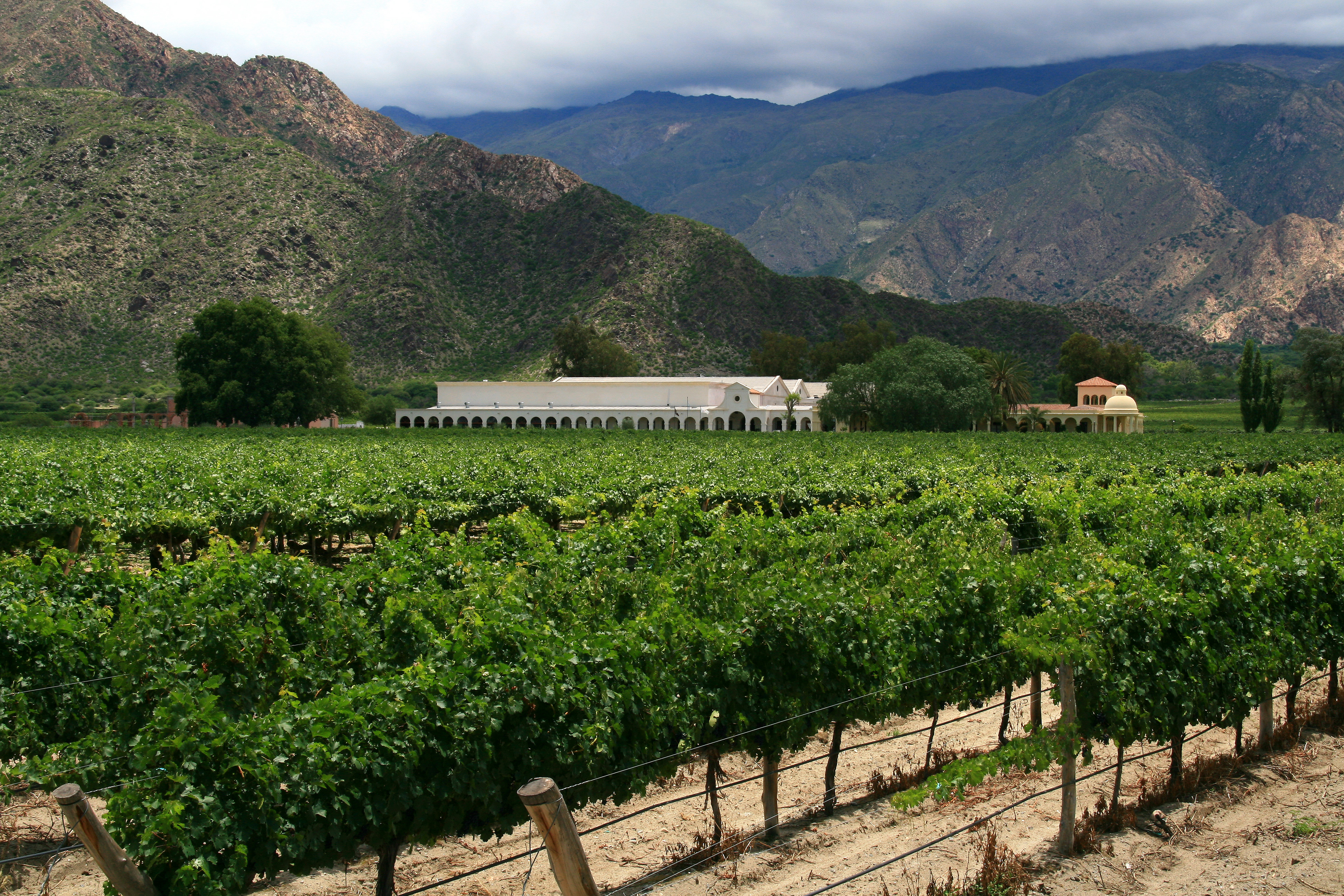
A winery located between the mountains in Cafayate.

Salta's economy is relatively underdeveloped, yet diverse. Its economy in 2006 was estimated at US$5.141 billion or, US$4,764 per capita, 45% below the national average. In 2012, its economy was estimated at $30.613 billion pesos (about US$6.743 billion) or $23,971 pesos (about US$5,280) per capita.

Manufacturing plays a significant role in Salta, adding 20% to the economy. Gas and petroleum from the Tartagal, Aguas Blancas, Madrejones and Campo Durán centres is transported to Buenos Aires and Rosario by pipes. There is also an oil refinery located at Campo Durán. Mining includes uranium at Iruya, La Poma and San Carlos; and silver at the Diablillos mine.

Agriculture and its derived industries are still an important activity in the province, adding over 10% to output. Tobacco, sugar cane and viticulture are the most important and produce most of the exports from the area. Other crops mostly for local consumption are maize, beans, citrus, bananas, and tomatoes. The sugar cane is processed in plants in Salta before it is sent to the rest of Argentina and other countries. The plant in San Martín de Tabacal is the most important of them. The famous wines of the Valles Calchaquíes region (mainly Torrontés, Malbec and Cabernet Sauvignon) near Cafayate are produced in numerous vineyards of diverse sizes. American breeds of cattle are raised only on the humid subtropical east, along with some sheep and goats.

== Tourism ==
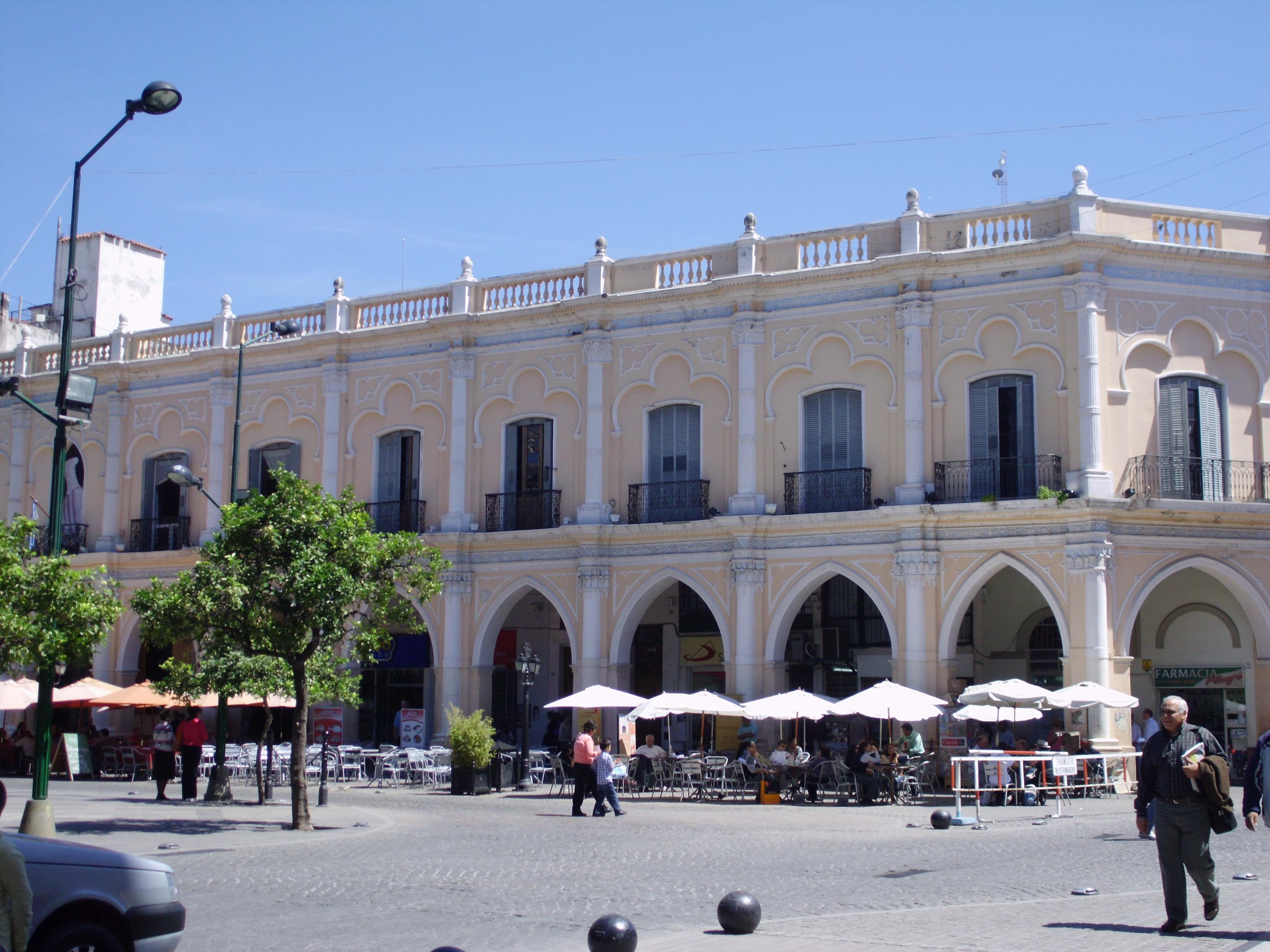
The Museum of High Altitude Archaeology, Salta

The Salta province is home to a number of natural, social and historic attractions.

The provincial capital city, also named Salta and nicknamed "La Linda" ("The beautiful") is both an important tourist destination, and the centre point for visiting the rest of the province. The city holds different attractions; among them are its colonial houses and cathedral, and the Museum of High Altitude Archaeology (Spanish:Museo de Arqueología de Alta Montaña de Salta) that holds the three frozen Inca mummies found at the Llullaillaco volcano and known as the Children of Llullaillaco .

The Tren a las Nubes ("Train to the Clouds") crosses canyons and cliffs before arriving at the 3,775 metres altitude (12,500 feet) of San Antonio de los Cobres. The red-rock formations of the Valles Calchaquíes and the wine-town of Cafayate are the second most visited place in the province. Many visit the Cachi mountains and the villages (such as Payogasta) around it.

There are three national parks in Salta: El Rey National Park in the Yungas jungle, Baritú National Park and Los Cardones National Park.

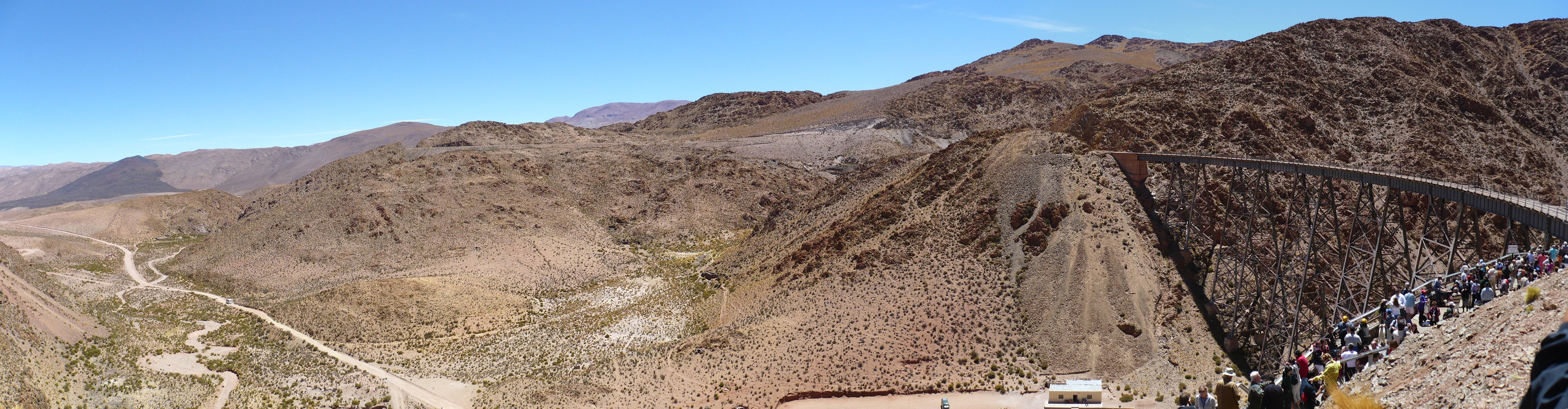
The Train to the Clouds one of the highest railways in the world, taking its way across the high peaks of the Cordillera de los Andes.

== Demographics ==
Historical population
Year	Pop.	±%
1869	88,933	—
1895	118,015	+32.7%
1914	142,156	+20.5%
1947	230,445	+62.1%
1960	412,854	+79.2%
1970	509,803	+23.5%
1980	662,870	+30.0%
1991	866,153	+30.7%
2001	1,079,051	+24.6%
2010	1,214,441	+12.5%

Ethno-racial groups in Salta (2022 census)
1. Undeclared (89.3%)
2. Native (10.0%)
3. Black (0.70%)

According to the results from the 2010 census [INDEC], the province has a population of 1,214,441. It constitutes 3.0% of the total population in Argentina. This represented a 12.5% increase in the population compared to 2001 census [INDEC] which had 1,079,051 inhabitants. 6.5% of the population or 79,204 persons declared themselves as having Indigenous background, making it one of the provinces that has a high percentage of indigenous people, being ranked 5th behind Chubut, Neuquén, Jujuy and Río Negro. The most populous indigenous groups in the province are the Wichí, which make up 24.9% of the total indigenous population followed by the Kolla (21.6%), and the Guaraní (13.7%). As well, 4,189 persons declared themselves to be Afro-Argentine.

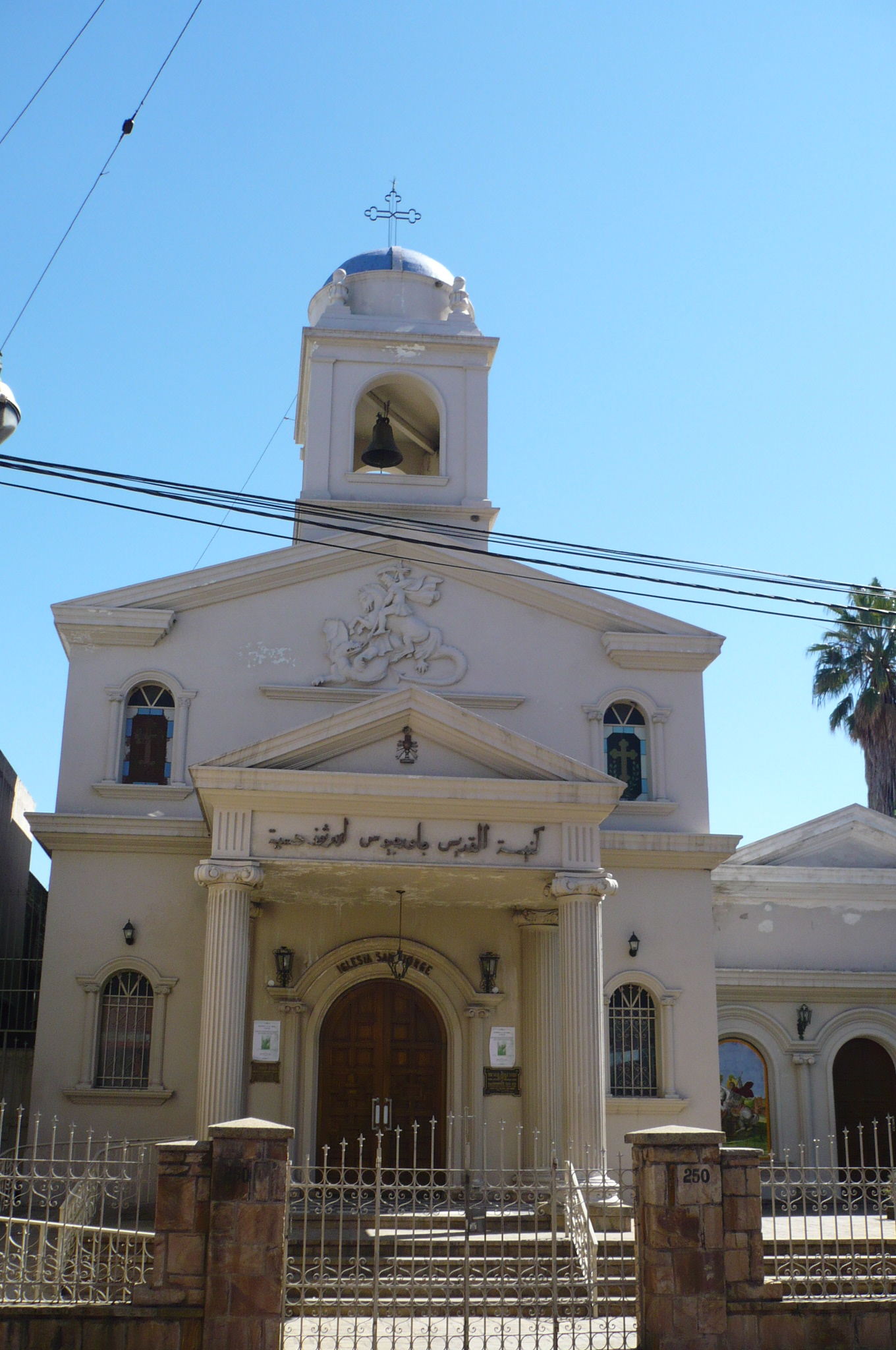
Antiochian Orthodox Saint George Church.

The province hosts a diverse foreign community: Christian Levantines of Syrian-Lebanese origin, Spaniards and Italians make up the largest groups. A small Ukrainian community has been there since the collapse of the Soviet Union and an Indian Sikh community has been living in Rosario de la Frontera since the 1940s. Other foreign people settled in the province are the Greek Cypriots, the Chinese, the Germans, the Francs, the Chileans, the Bolivians, the Paraguayans and the Slavs from the Adriatic (mainly Serbs and Croats). The Jewish community has a synagogue and the Muslims have a mosque, both in Salta City. Salta's Jews are mostly of Ashkenazim origin, but there are also a few Sefardim families.

== Politics ==
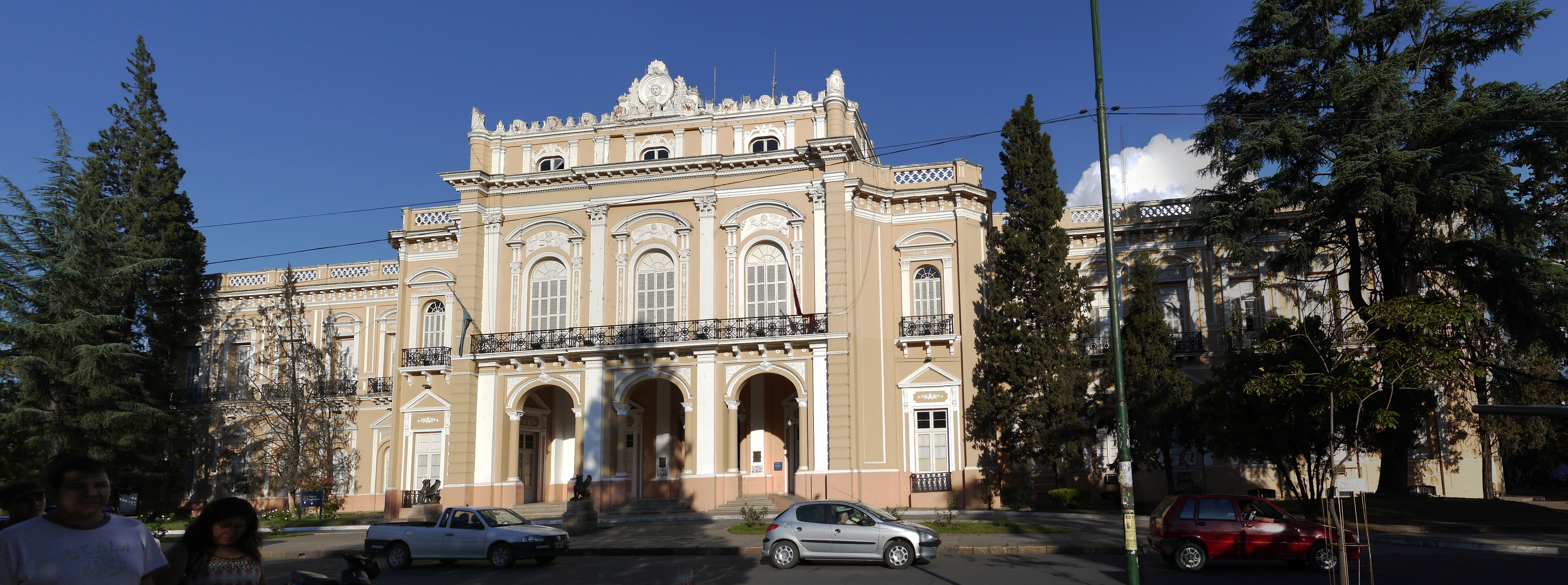
Legislature of Salta

The province is governed as representative and republican form of government. The provincial government is divided into three branches: the executive, headed by a popularly elected governor, who appoints the cabinet; the legislative; and the judiciary, headed by the Supreme Court.

The Constitution of Salta Province forms the formal law of the province.

In Argentina, the most important law enforcement organization is the Argentine Federal Police but the additional work is carried out by the Salta Provincial Police.

== Political division ==
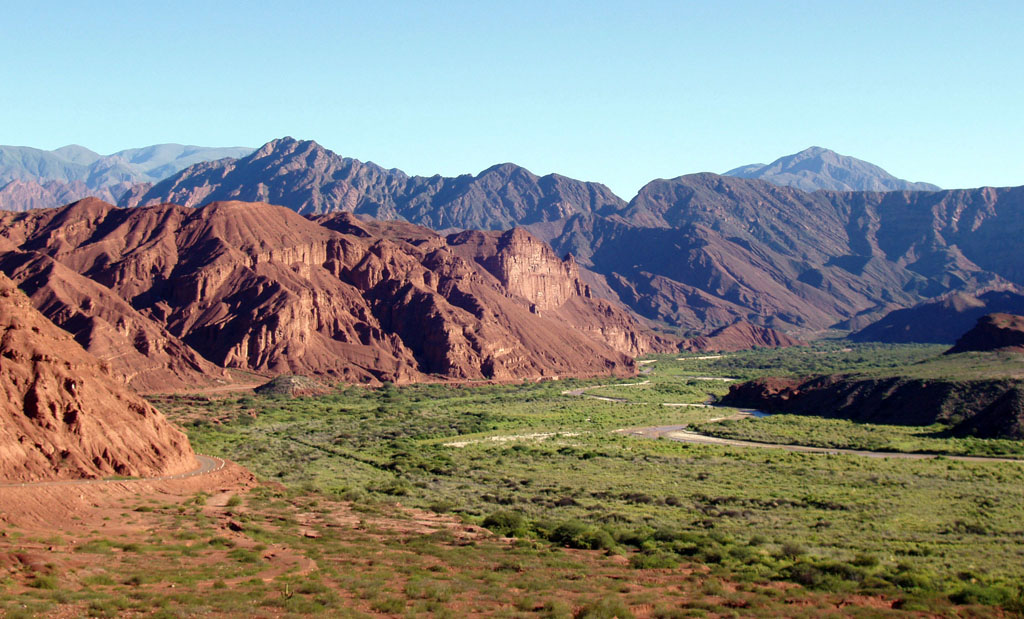
Valles Calchaquíes near Cafayate.

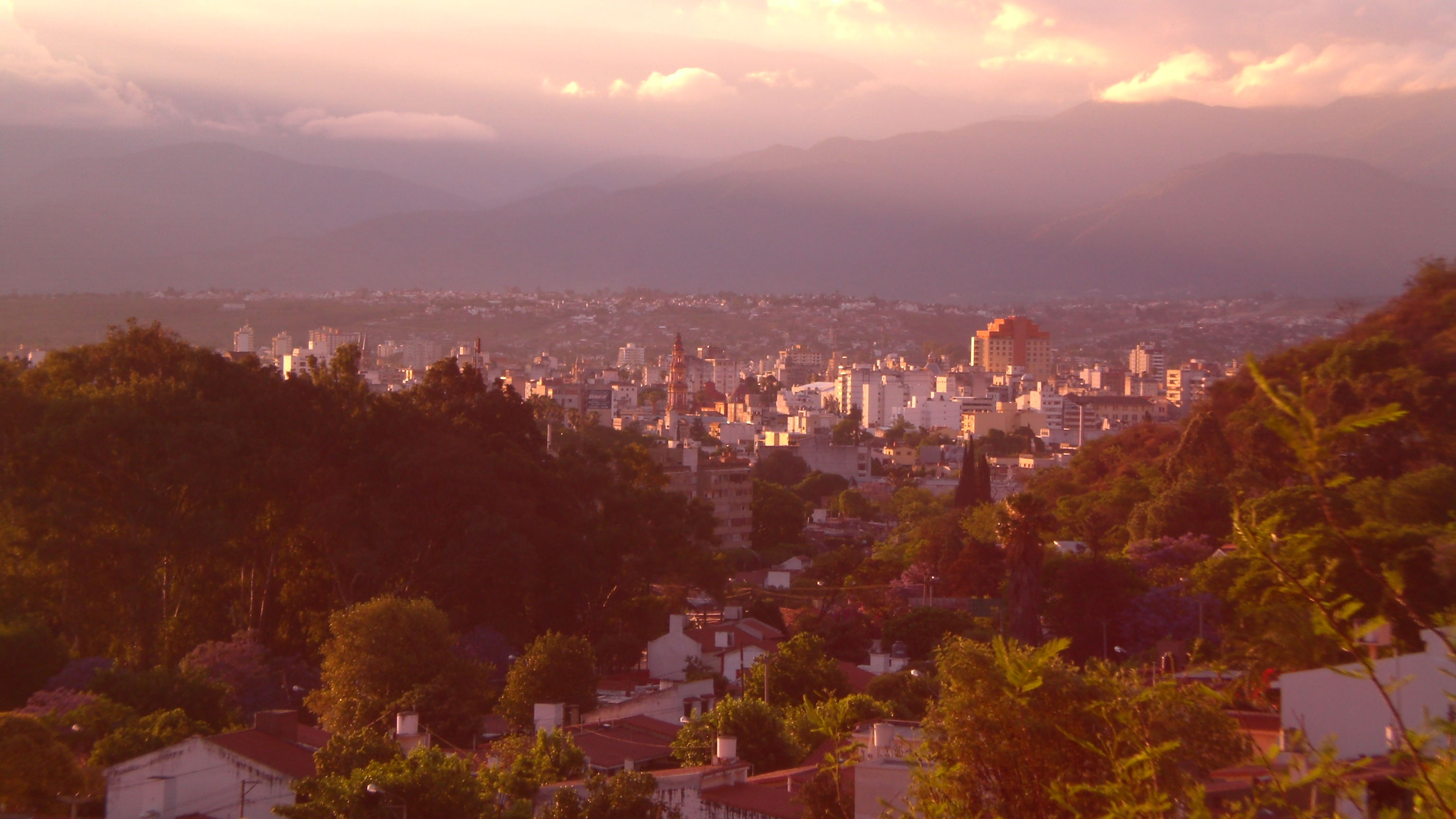
View of the Lerma Valley and the city of Salta.

The province is divided in 23 departments (Spanish: departamentos), containing 59 municipalities (Spanish: municipios). The capital of the province is the city of Salta, which is where the provincial government is located at.

Map	Departament	Area	Population (2010 Census)	Towns and municipalities (in bold: department capital)
	Anta	21,945 km^{2} (8,473 sq mi)	70,170	Apolinario Saravia; El Quebrachal; General Pizarro; **Joaquín Víctor González**; Las Lajitas
	Cachi	2,925 km^{2} (1,129 sq mi)	8,948	**Cachi**; Payogasta
	Cafayate	1,570 km^{2} (610 sq mi)	17,829	**Cafayate**
	Capital	1,722 km^{2} (665 sq mi)	627,704	**Salta**; Villa San Lorenzo
	de Cerrillos	640 km^{2} (250 sq mi)	55,949	**Cerrillos**; La Merced
	Chicoana	910 km^{2} (350 sq mi)	24,729	**Chicoana**; El Carril
	General Güemes	2,365 km^{2} (913 sq mi)	56,166	Campo Santo; El Bordo; **General Güemes**
	General José de San Martín	16,257 km^{2} (6,277 sq mi)	178,004	Aguaray; Embarcación; General Ballivián; General Mosconi; Salvador Mazza; **Tartagal**
	Guachipas	2,785 km^{2} (1,075 sq mi)	3,491	**Guachipas**
	Iruya	3,515 km^{2} (1,357 sq mi)	6,118	**Iruya**; Isla de Cañas
	La Caldera	867 km^{2} (335 sq mi)	12,299	**La Caldera**; Vaqueros
	La Candelaria	1,525 km^{2} (589 sq mi)	7,205	El Jardín; El Tala; **La Candelaria**
	La Poma	4,447 km^{2} (1,717 sq mi)	1,789	**La Poma**
	La Viña	2,152 km^{2} (831 sq mi)	8,900	Coronel Moldes; **La Viña**
	Los Andes	25,951 km^{2} (10,020 sq mi)	7,182	**San Antonio de los Cobres**; Tolar Grande
	Metán	5,235 km^{2} (2,021 sq mi)	48,245	El Galpón; **San José de Metán**; Río Pîedras
	Molinos	3,600 km^{2} (1,400 sq mi)	5,820	**Molinos**; Seclantás
	Orán	11,892 km^{2} (4,592 sq mi)	160,642	Colonia Santa Rosa; Hipólito Yrigoyen; Pichanal; **San Ramón de la Nueva Orán**; Urundel
	Rivadavia	25,951 km^{2} (10,020 sq mi)	38,113	Rivadavia Banda Norte; **Rivadavia Banda Sur**; Santa Victoria Este
	Rosario de la Frontera	5,402 km^{2} (2,086 sq mi)	33,809	El Potrero; **Rosario de la Frontera**
	Rosario de Lerma	5,110 km^{2} (1,970 sq mi)	51,028	Campo Quijano; **Rosario de Lerma**
	San Carlos	5,125 km^{2} (1,979 sq mi)	7,798	Angastaco; Animaná; **San Carlos**
	Santa Victoria	3,912 km^{2} (1,510 sq mi)	9,413	Los Toldos; Nazareno; **Santa Victoria Oeste**

== Villages ==
- Campichuelo
- Campo La Cruz
- Capiazuti
- Carboncito
- Copo Quile
- El Naranjo
- El Potrero
- La Misión
- La Puerta
- La Unión
- Las Costas
- Luracatao
- Misión Chaqueña
- Misión Kilómetro 6
- Misión Tierras Fiscales
- Nazareno
- Pacara
- Piquirenda
- Pluma de Pato
- Poscaya

== See also ==
- 1948 Salta earthquake
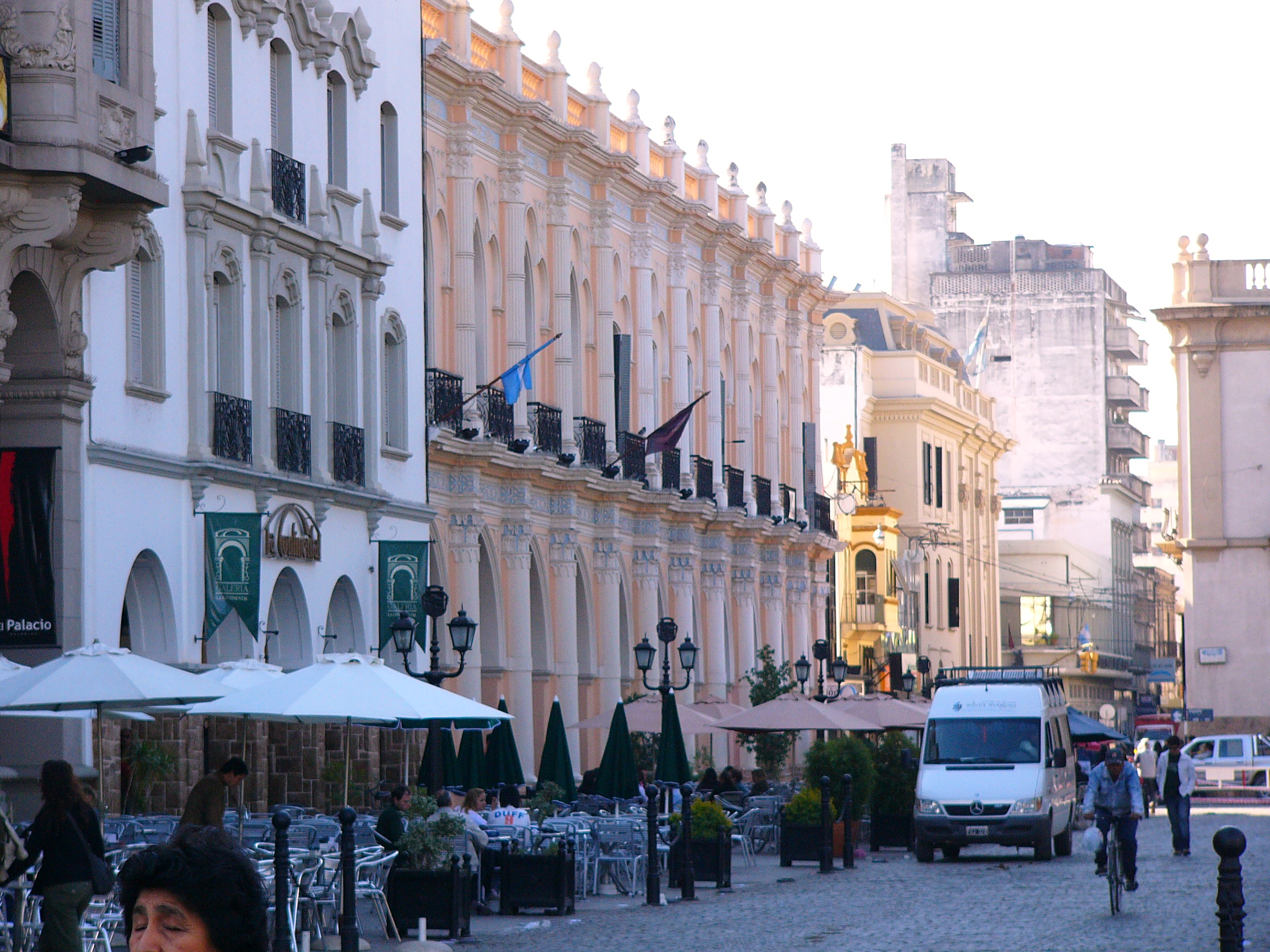

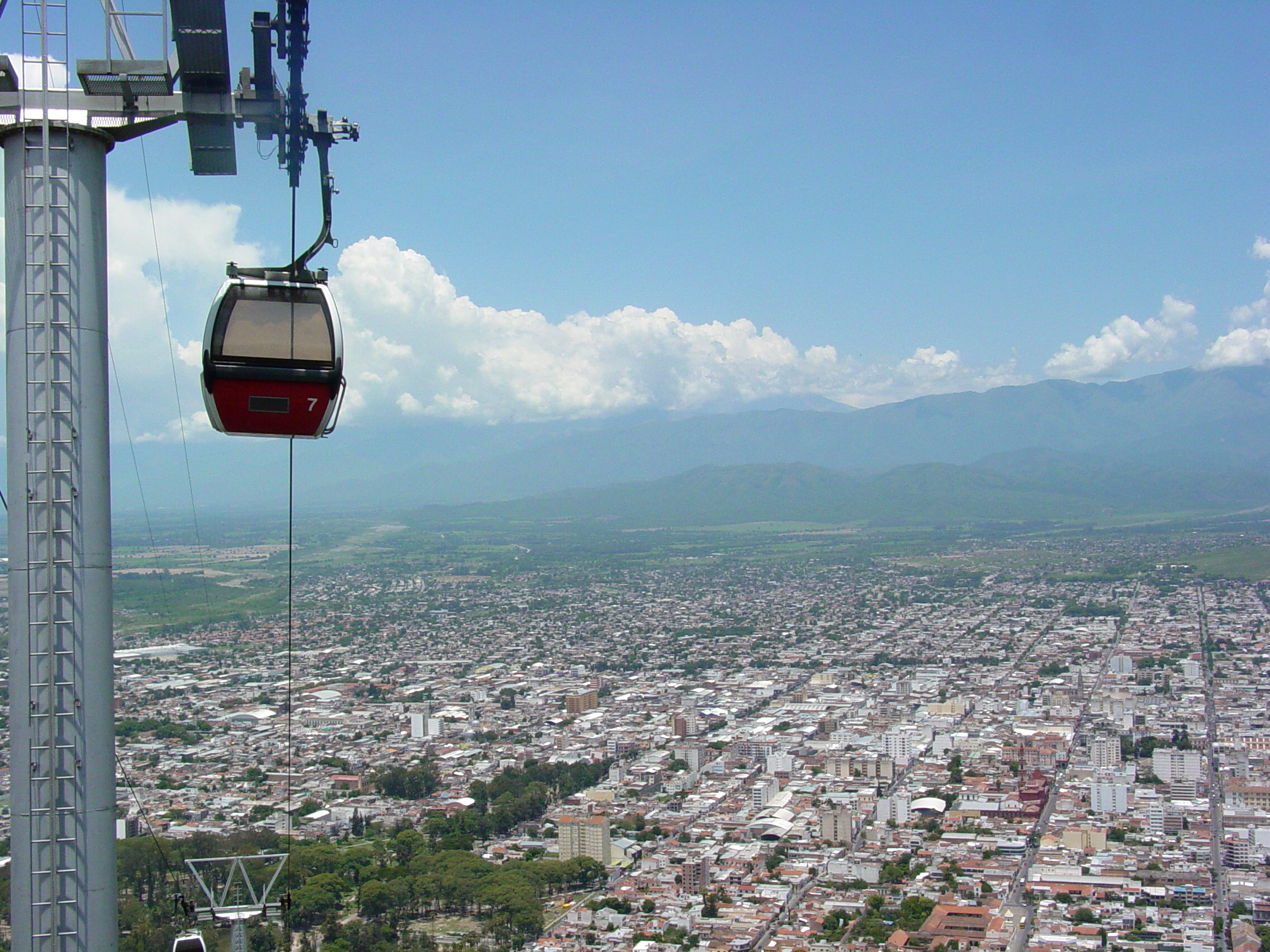

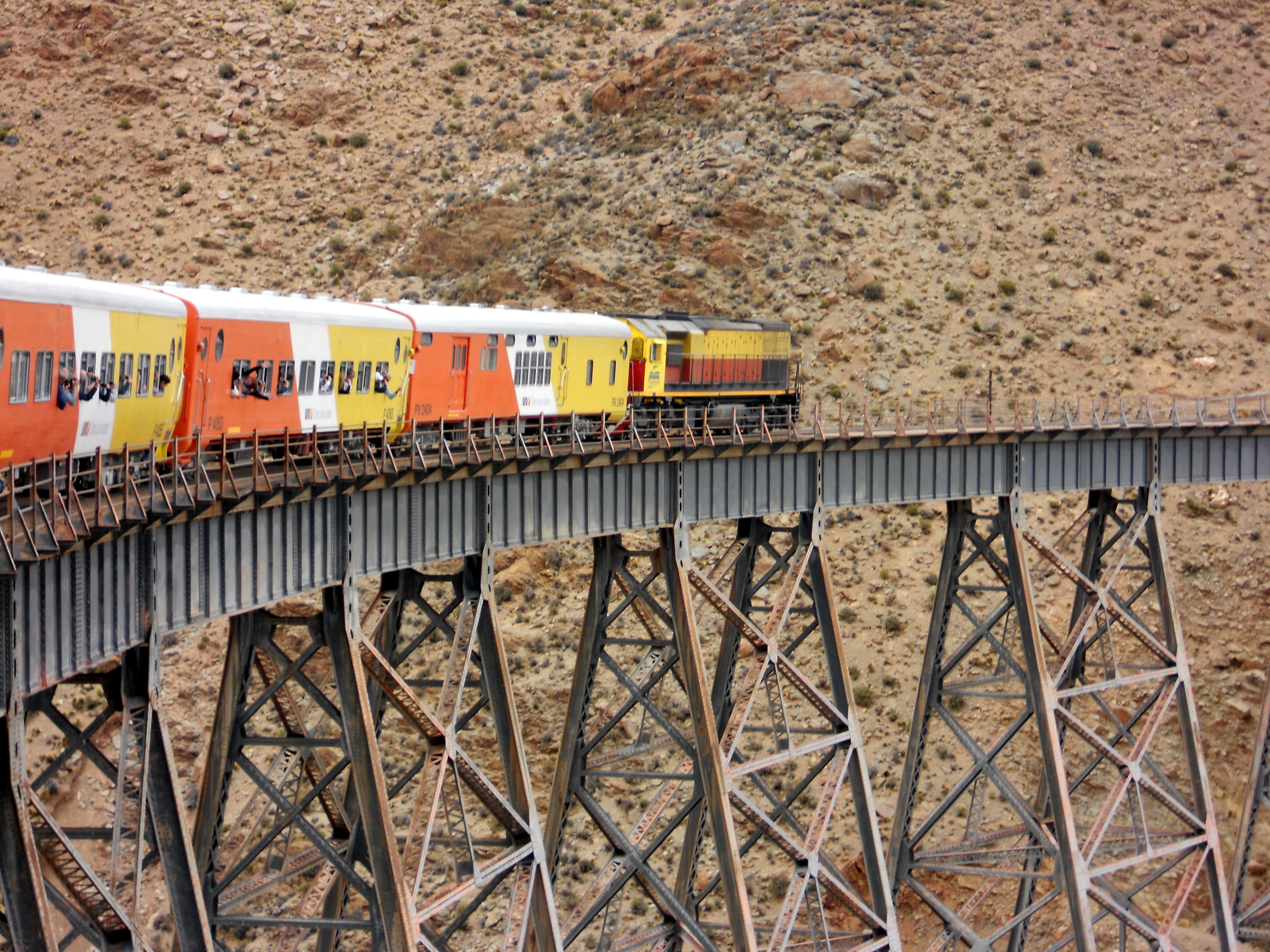

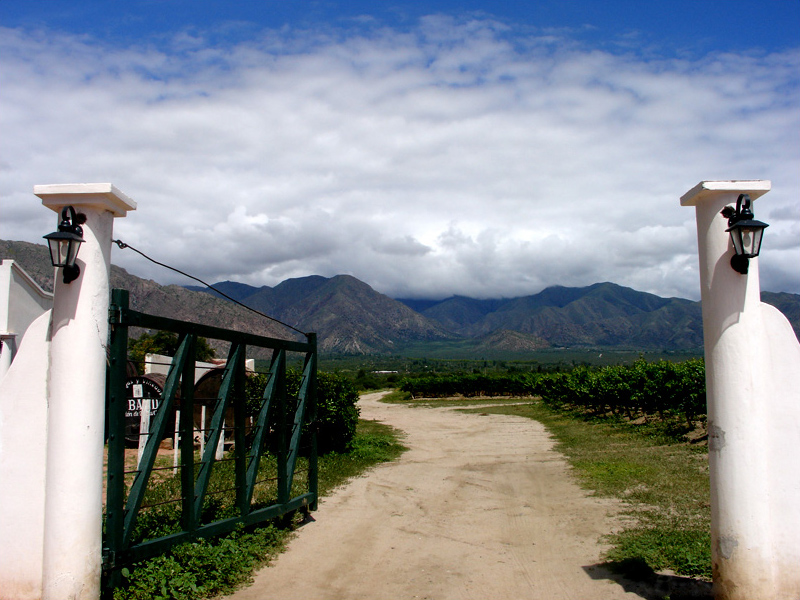

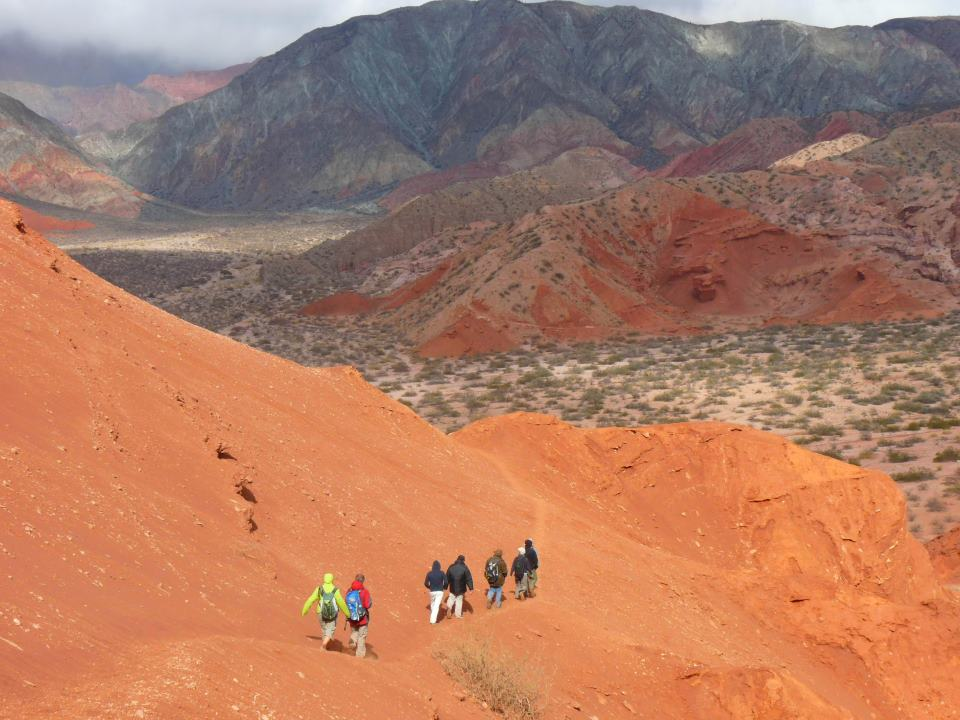

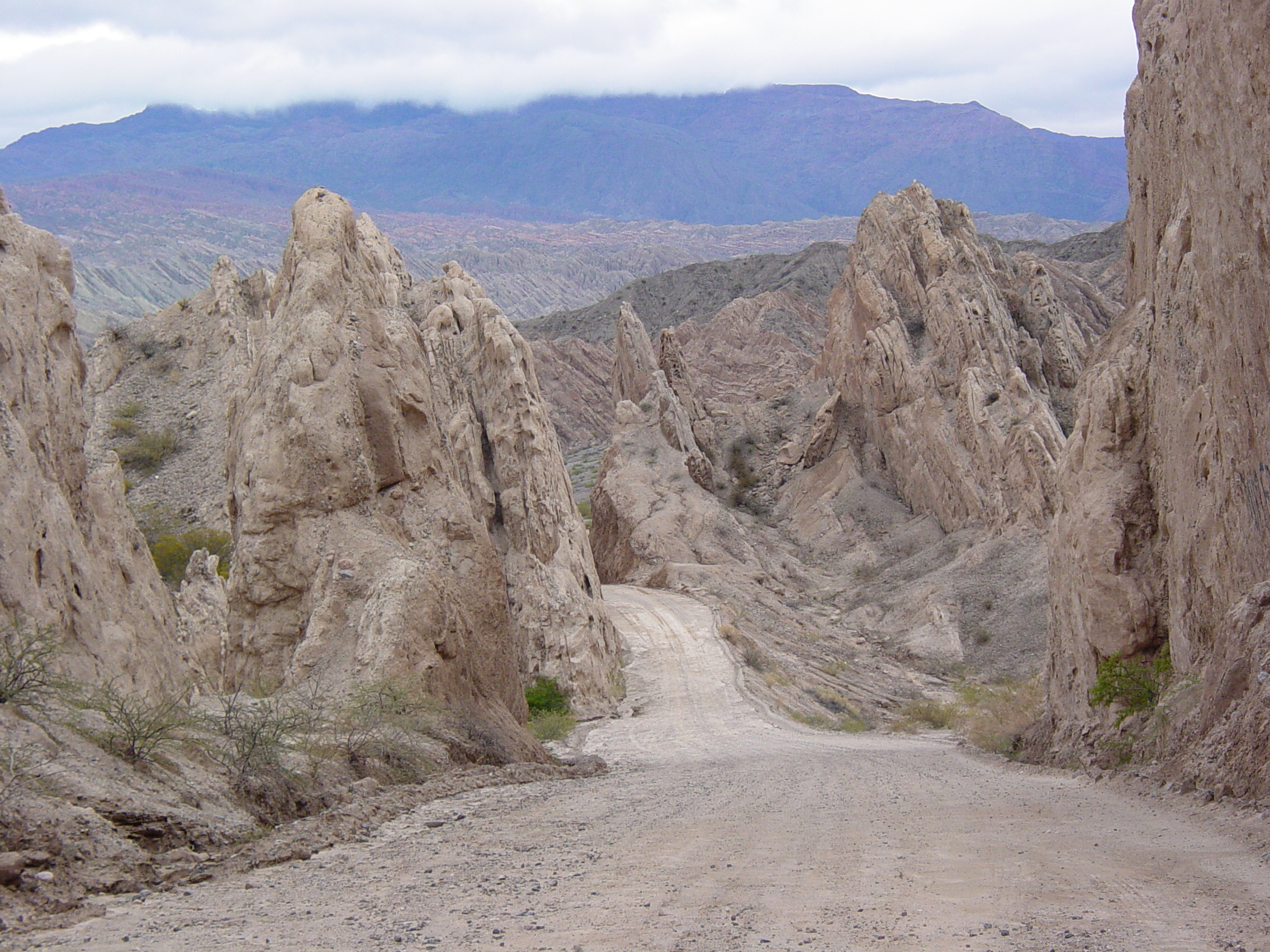

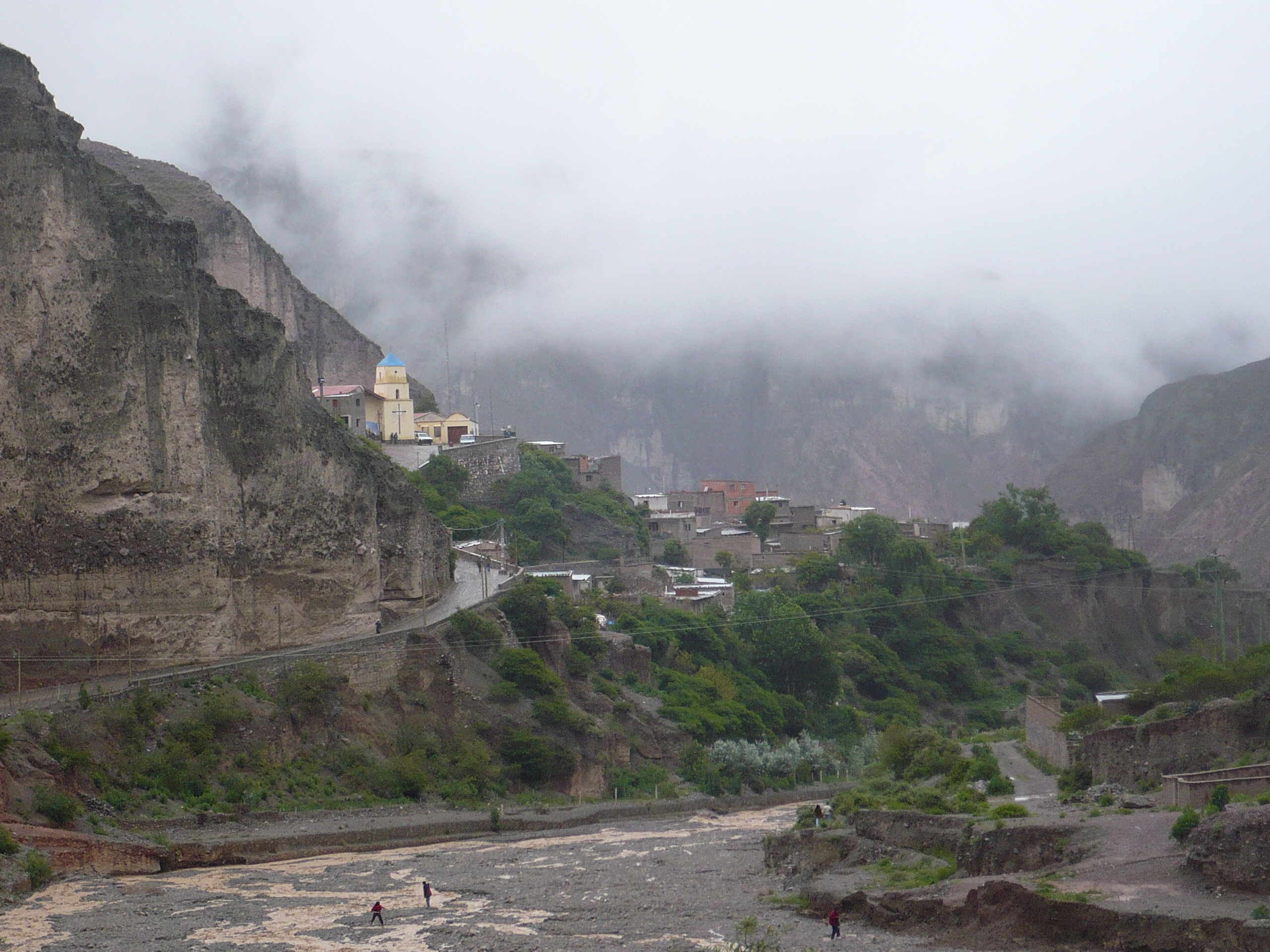

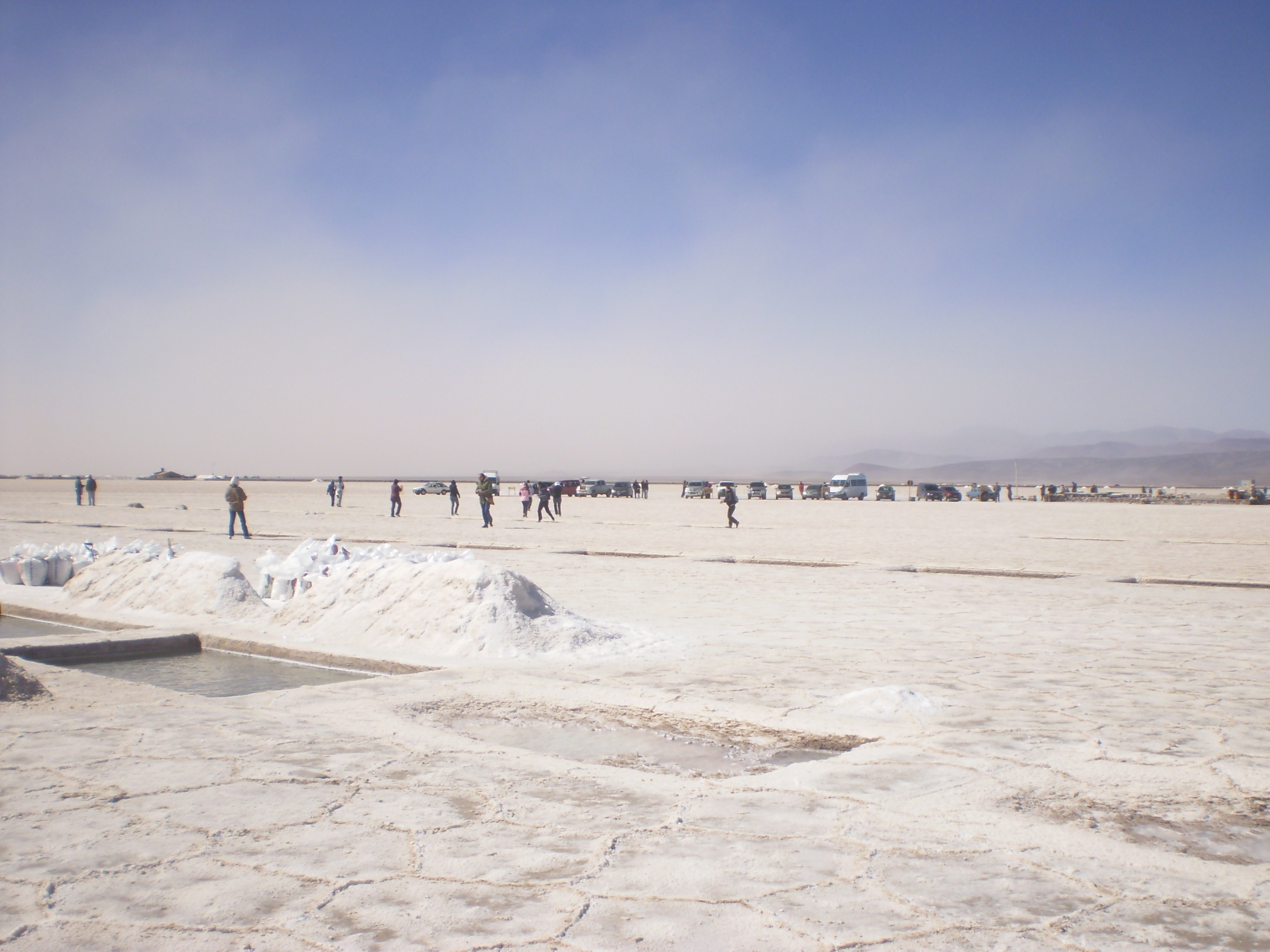

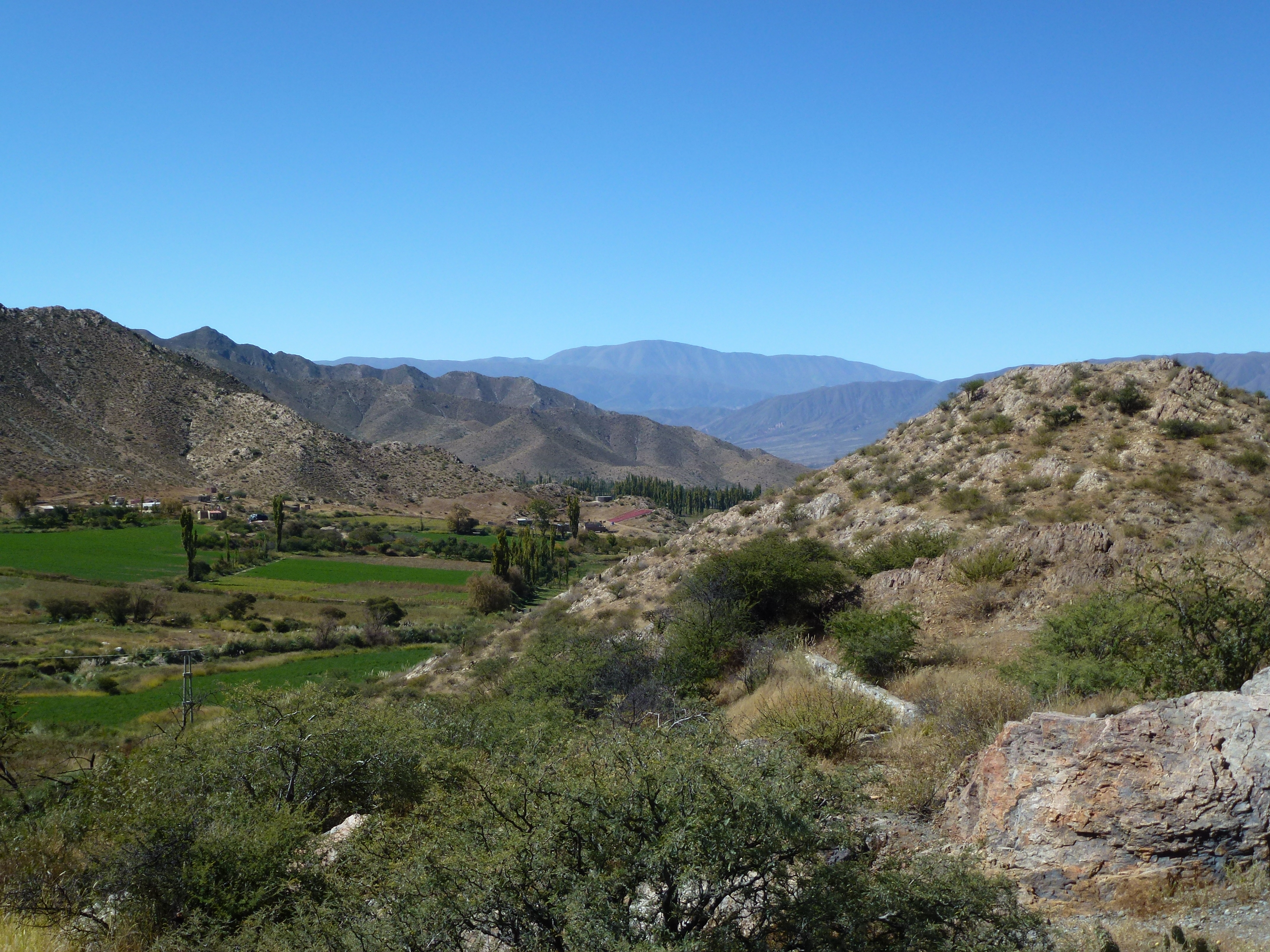

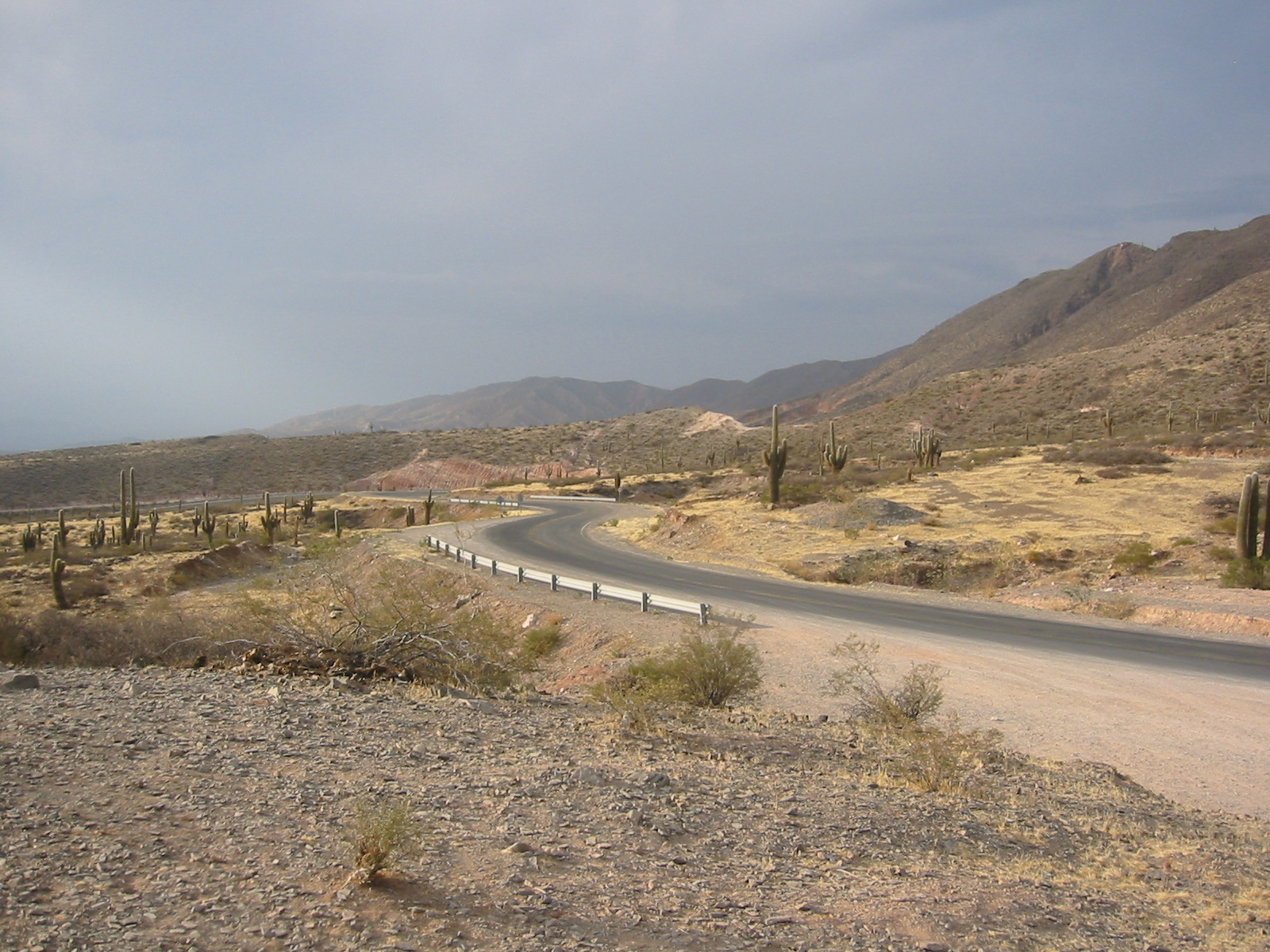
