= Chamber of Deputies of Salta =

Legislative body in Salta, Argentina

Chamber of Deputies of Salta Province Cámara de Diputados de la Provincia de Salta

Type
- Type: Lower house of the Legislature of Salta

Leadership
- President: Esteban Amat Lacroix, FJ Sáenz since 10 December 2019
- Vice President: Ignacio Jarsún Lamónaca, FJ Sáenz since 10 December 2019
- Majority Leader: Germán Darío Rallé, FJ Sáenz since 10 December 2019
- Minority Leader: Franco Hernández Berni, Todos since 10 December 2019

Structure
- Seats: 60
- Political groups: Government (45); Justicialist - Governor Sáenz Leadership (28); Salta Has a Future (10); More Salta (5); October 8th (1); Memory and Social Movilization (1); Opposition (15): Frente de Todos (5); Now Salta (3); Radical Civic Union (2); Independent Salta (2); PRO (1); Igualar (1); Change Salta TAC

Elections
- Last election: 15 August 2021 (30 seats)

Meeting place
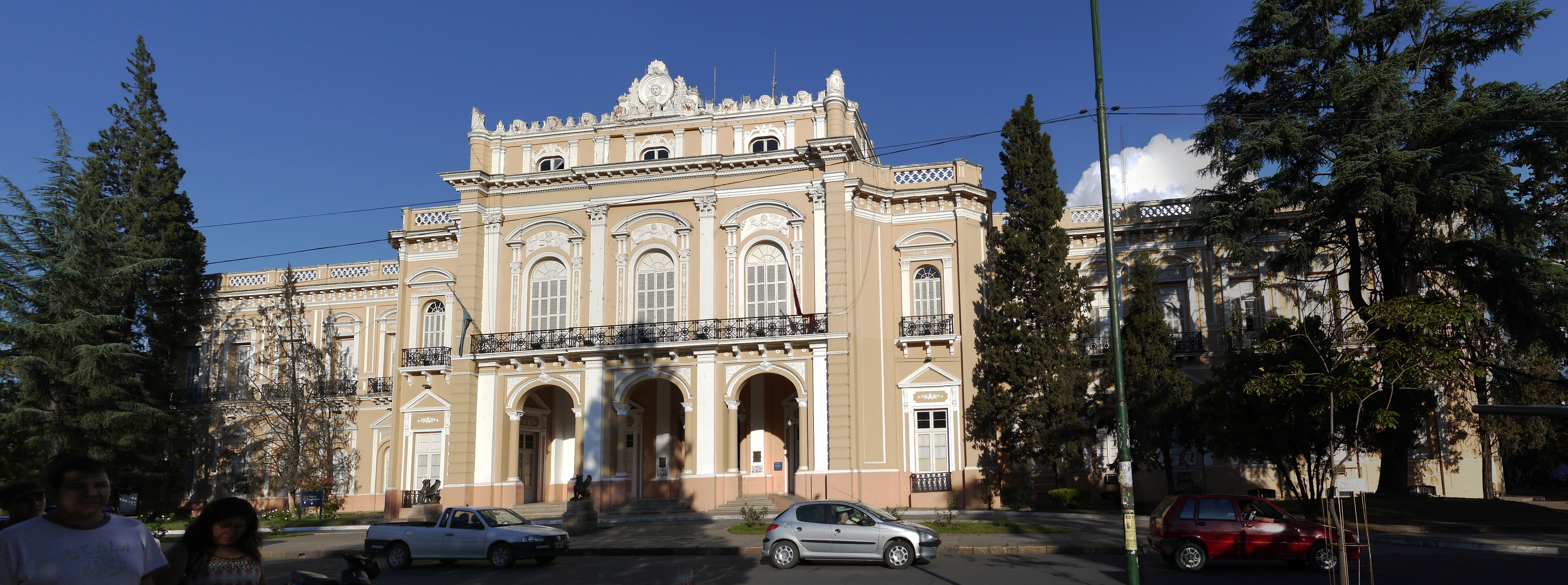
- Legislative Palace; Salta, Salta Province

Website
- https://www.diputadosalta.gob.ar/

The Chamber of Deputies of Salta Province (Spanish: Cámara de Diputados de la Provincia de Salta) is the lower house of the Legislature of Salta Province, one of Argentina's 23 provinces. It is made up of 60 deputies elected in each of the 23 departments of the province.

Deputies are elected using a mixed first-past-the-post / proportional representation system, wherein the most populous departments are allocated more seats, while the smallest departments elect a single deputy. The most populous department is Capital Department, which is allocated 19 seats. Members are elected for four-year terms, and, as in the National Chamber of Deputies and most other provincial legislatures, elections are held every two years, so that half of its members are up in each election.

Alongside the Senate, the Chamber of Deputies convenes in the Legislative Palace, in the provincial capital of Salta. The building, a city landmark, is of an Italian academic style. Its construction began in 1892 and extended until 1902.

== Deputies per department ==
Departament	Deputies
Anta	3
Cachi	1
Cafayate	1
Capital	19
Cerrillos	2
Chicoana	1
General Güemes	2
General San Martín	6
Guachipas	1
Iruya	1
La Caldera	1
La Candelaria	1
La Poma	1
La Viña	1
Los Andes	1
Metán	3
Molinos	1
Orán	6
Rivadavia	2
Rosario de la Frontera	2
Rosario de Lerma	2
San Carlos	1
Santa Victoria	1
Total	60

== Current members (2021–2023 term) ==
Department	Deputy	Bloc	Term start	Term end
Anta	Marcela del Valle Leguina	Justicialista Gustavo Sáenz Conducción	2021	2025
Anta	Alejandra Beatriz Navarro	Más Salta	2021	2025
Anta	Héctor Orlando Escobar	Justicialista Gustavo Sáenz Conducción	2022	2025
Cachi	Federico Miguel Cañizares	Justicialista Gustavo Sáenz Conducción	2021	2025
Cafayate	Patricio Peñalba Arias	Justicialista Gustavo Sáenz Conducción	2021	2025
Capital	Bernardo José Biella Calvet	Salta Independiente	2021	2025
Capital	Laura Deolinda Cartuccia	Salta Has a Future	2019	2023
Capital	Roque Ramón Cornejo Avellaneda	Now Salta	2021	2025
Capital	Isabel Marcelina de Vita	Frente de Todos	2021	2025
Capital	Omar Exeni Armiñana	Justicialista Gustavo Sáenz Conducción	2019	2023
Capital	María Cristina Fiore Viñuales	Now Salta	2019	2023
Capital	María Cristina Frísoli	Salta Independiente	2021	2025
Capital	Mónica Gabriela Juárez	October 8th	2019	2023
Capital	Víctor Manuel "Vitín" Lamberto	Salta Has a Future	2021	2025
Capital	David Jesús Leiva	Memory and Social Movilization	2021	2025
Capital	Julieta Estefanía Perdigón Weber	Now Salta	2021	2023
Capital	Noelia Cecilia Rigó Barea	Justicialista Gustavo Sáenz Conducción	2019	2023
Capital	Juan Esteban Romero	Salta has a Future	2021	2025
Capital	Juan Carlos Francisco Roque Posse	Salta has a Future	2021	2025
Capital	María Victoria Saicha Ibáñez	Salta has a Future	2021	2025
Capital	Enrique Daniel Sansone	Salta has a Future	2019	2023
Capital	Sofía Sierra	PRO	2021	2025
Capital	Adrián Alfredo Valenzuela Giantomasi	Justicialista Gustavo Sáenz Conducción	2019	2023
Capital	María del Socorro Villamayor	Salta has a Future	2019	2023
Cerrillos	Luis Fernando Albeza	Justicialista Gustavo Sáenz Conducción	2019	2023
Cerrillos	Gonzalo Caro Dávalos	Justicialista Gustavo Sáenz Conducción	2019	2023
Chicoana	María Del Socorro López	Justicialista Gustavo Sáenz Conducción	2021	2025
General Güemes	Germán Darío Rallé	Justicialista Gustavo Sáenz Conducción	2019	2023
General Güemes	Daniel Alejandro Segura Giménez	Más Salta	2019	2023
General San Martín	Ana Laura Córdoba	Justicialista Gustavo Sáenz Conducción	2019	2023
General San Martín	Franco Estéban Francisco Hernández Berni	Frente de Todos	2019	2023
General San Martín	Matías Monteagudo	Radical Civic Union	2019	2023
General San Martín	Gladys Lidia Paredes	Más Salta	2021	2025
General San Martín	Jorge Miguel Restom	Frente de Todos	2021	2025
General San Martín	Santiago Raúl Vargas	Radical Civic Union	2021	2025
Guachipas	Ernesto Gerardo Guanca	Justicialista Gustavo Sáenz Conducción	2019	2023
Iruya	Ricardo Germán Vargas	Justicialista Gustavo Sáenz Conducción	2021	2025
La Caldera	Gustavo Javier Pantaleón	Justicialista Gustavo Sáenz Conducción	2019	2023
La Candelaria	Francisco Fabio Rodríguez	Justicialista Gustavo Sáenz Conducción	2019	2023
La Poma	Roberto Ángel Bonifacio	Justicialista Gustavo Sáenz Conducción	2019	2023
La Viña	Esteban Amat Lacroix	Justicialista Gustavo Sáenz Conducción	2019	2023
Los Andes	Azucena Atanasia Salva	Justicialista Gustavo Sáenz Conducción	2019	2023
Metán	Gustavo Bernardo Dantur	Más Salta	2021	2025
Metán	Nancy Liliana Jaime	Más Salta	2021	2025
Metán	Antonio Sebastián Otero	Salta has a Future	2021	2025
Molinos	Fabio Enrique López	Justicialista Gustavo Sáenz Conducción	2019	2023
Orán	Carolina Rosana Ceaglio	Justicialista Gustavo Sáenz Conducción	2021	2025
Orán	Patricia del Carmen Hucena	Justicialista Gustavo Sáenz Conducción	2019	2023
Orán	Jorgelina Silvana Juárez	Frente de Todos	2019	2023
Orán	Martín Miguel Pérez	Justicialista Gustavo Sáenz Conducción	2019	2023
Orán	Teodora Ramona Riquelme	Igualar	2021	2025
Orán	Claudia Gloria Seco	Salta has a Future	2021	2025
Rivadavia	Moisés Justiniano Balderrama	Justicialista Gustavo Sáenz Conducción	2021	2025
Rivadavia	Rogelio Guaipo Segundo	Justicialista Gustavo Sáenz Conducción	2021	2025
Rosario de la Frontera	Pablo Raúl Alejandro Gómez	Frente de Todos	2021	2025
Rosario de la Frontera	Gustavo Orlando Orozco	Cambia Salta (TAC)	2021	2025
Rosario de Lerma	Lino Fernando Yonar	Justicialista Gustavo Sáenz Conducción	2019	2023
Rosario de Lerma	Mabel Verónica Janeth Barboza	Salta has a Future	2023	2023
San Carlos	Elena Nahir Díaz	Justicialista Gustavo Sáenz Conducción	2021	2023
Santa Victoria	Osvaldo Francisco Acosta	Justicialista Gustavo Sáenz Conducción	2019	2023
