= Metán Department =

Metán
- Department
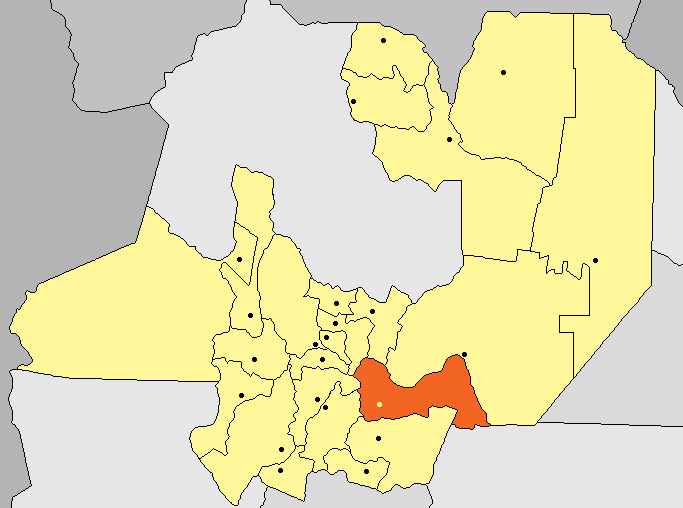
- Coordinates: 25°29′49″S 64°58′16″W
- Country: Argentina
- Province: Salta

Area
  - Total: 5,235 km^{2} (2,021 sq mi)

Population (2010)
  - Total: 39,006
  - Density: 7.451/km^{2} (19.30/sq mi)

Metán is a department located in Salta Province, in Argentina.

With an area of 5,235 km^{2} (2,021 sq mi) it borders to the north with the departments of General Güemes and Anta, to the east with Anta, to the south with Santiago del Estero Province and Rosario de la Frontera Department, and to the west with Guachipas Department, La Viña Department, and Capital Department.

== History ==
The department was created during the government of Manuel Solá (1859-1860) with territories ceded by the Rosario de la Frontera Department.

== Towns and municipalities ==
- San José de Metán
- El Galpón
- Río Piedras
- El Tunal
- Lumbreras
- Metán Viejo
- San José de Orquera
- Presa El Tunal
- Alto del Mistol
- Bajo Grande
- Esteco
- Juramento
- Las Juntas
- Ovejería
- Punta de Agua
- Ricardo Schneidewind
- Yatasto
- El Naranjo
- Paraje del Juramento
