= Guemes =

Guemes or Güemes may refer to:

- De Güemes, a Spanish surname
- Guemes Island, a small island in western Skagit County, Washington state, USA
- General Güemes, Salta, a town in the center of the province of Salta, Argentina
- General Güemes Department, Chaco, the largest and the northernmost department of Chaco Province in Argentina
- General Güemes Department, Salta, Salta Province, Argentina
- Martín Miguel de Güemes, Argentine 19th century military leader
