= Metan =

Metan may refer to:

- San José de Metán, usually shortened to Metán, a city in the south of the province of Salta, Argentina
- Metán Viejo, a village and rural municipality in Salta Province
- Metán Department, an administrative division of Salta Province, Argentina
- Methane, a chemical compound
