= Bettina Romero =

Argentine politician

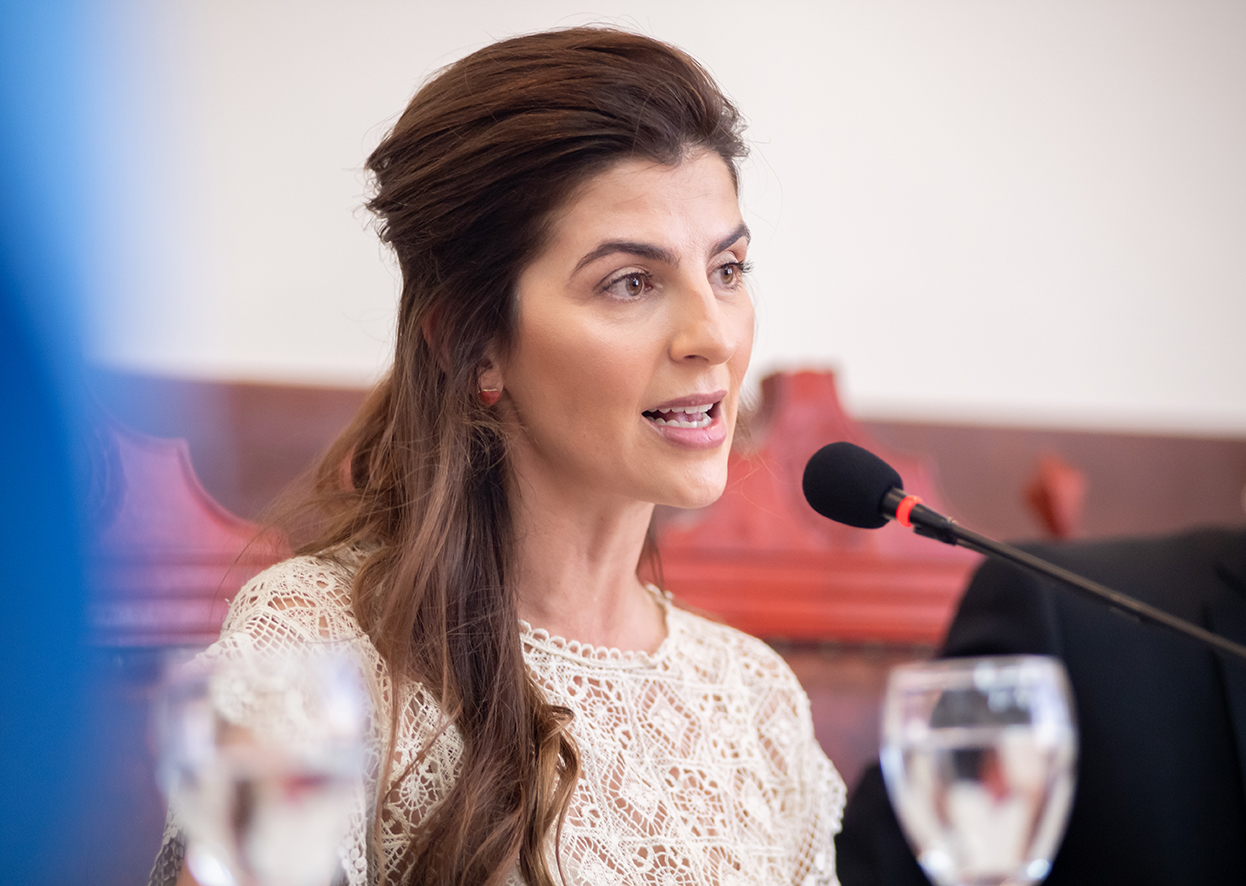

Mayor of Salta
- In office 10 December 2019 – 10 December 2023
- Preceded by: Gustavo Sáenz
- Succeeded by: Emiliano Durand

Provincial Deputy of Salta
- In office 24 November 2017 – 23 November 2019
- Constituency: Capital Department

Personal details
- Born: 19 July 1978 (age 48) Salta, Argentina
- Party: Salta Nos Une (since 2017)
- Other political affiliations: Juntos por el Cambio (since 2015)
- Education: Universidad de Belgrano

Bettina Inés Romero (born 19 July 1978) is an Argentine lawyer and politician, currently serving as mayor of Salta. She is the first woman to hold the post in the city's history.

She is part of a political family in Salta Province; her father is former governor of Salta Province Juan Carlos Romero, himself the son of another governor, Roberto Romero.

== Early life ==
Bettina Inés Romero was born on 19 July 1978 in Salta, daughter of Juan Carlos Romero and Carmen Marcuzzi. She was born into a political family: Juan Carlos was governor of Salta Province and currently serves as a National Senator, both positions also held by his father, Roberto Romero (1927–1922).

She studied law at the Universidad de Belgrano, later completing a master's degree in South American political economy from Georgetown University.

== Political career ==
Romero began her political activism in various NGOs. She served as director for the Argentine Northwest Region of the Ministry of Social Development during the government of President Mauricio Macri. In 2017, she was elected to the Chamber of Deputies of Salta in the Capital Department as part of the Salta Nos Une ("Salta Unites Us") list. In November 2017, she was elected as the lower chamber's representative to the Salta Province Council of Magistracy.

In 2019, she ran for mayor of the City of Salta, hoping to succeed Gustavo Sáenz, whose successful gubernatorial candidacy she supported. She won the Salta Nos Une primaries in August, and later, in November, she won the mayorship with 52.6% of the vote against the Frente de Todos candidate, David Leiva.

== Personal life ==
Romero is married to wine merchant Francisco Lavaque, with whom she has three children.

== Electoral history ==
=== Executive ===
Electoral history of Bettina Romero
| Election | Office | List | Votes | | | Result | Ref. |
| Election | Office | List | Total | % | P. | Result | Ref. |
|---|---|---|---|---|---|---|---|
| 2019 | Mayor of Salta | Salta Nos Une | 148,964 | 52.60% | 1st | Elected | |

=== Legislative ===
Electoral history of Bettina Romero
| Election | Office | List | # | District | Votes | | | Result | Ref. |
| Election | Office | List | # | District | Total | % | P. | Result | Ref. |
|---|---|---|---|---|---|---|---|---|---|
| 2017 | Provincial Deputy | A Change for Salta | 1 | Capital Department | 63,634 | 21.40% | 1st (Note: Presented on an electoral list. The data shown represents the share of the vote the entire party/alliance received in that constituency.) | Elected | |

Political offices
| Preceded by Gustavo Sáenz | Mayor of Salta; 2019–2025 | Succeeded by Emiliano Durand |
