= San Juan, Salta =

Coordinates: 22°43′32.38″S 65°13′52.61″W

San Juan
- Village
- Interactive map of San Juan
- Country: Argentina
- Province: Salta Province
- Department: Iruya Department
- Time zone: UTC−3 (ART)

San Juan is a small village in northwestern Argentina. It is part of the Iruya Department in the Salta Province, located 7 km north of the Iruya village, 4 km northeast of San Isidro and 4 km west of Chiyayoc.

San Juan is part of Finca El Potrero. The village lives from tourism and agriculture. In San Juan, potatoes and corn are grown and geese, goats, and sheep are raised. San Juan is accessible from Iruya by walking in about five hours, in parts via a steep footpath.

== Events ==
The festival of the local saint takes place on 2 February.
