= David Leiva =

Argentine politician

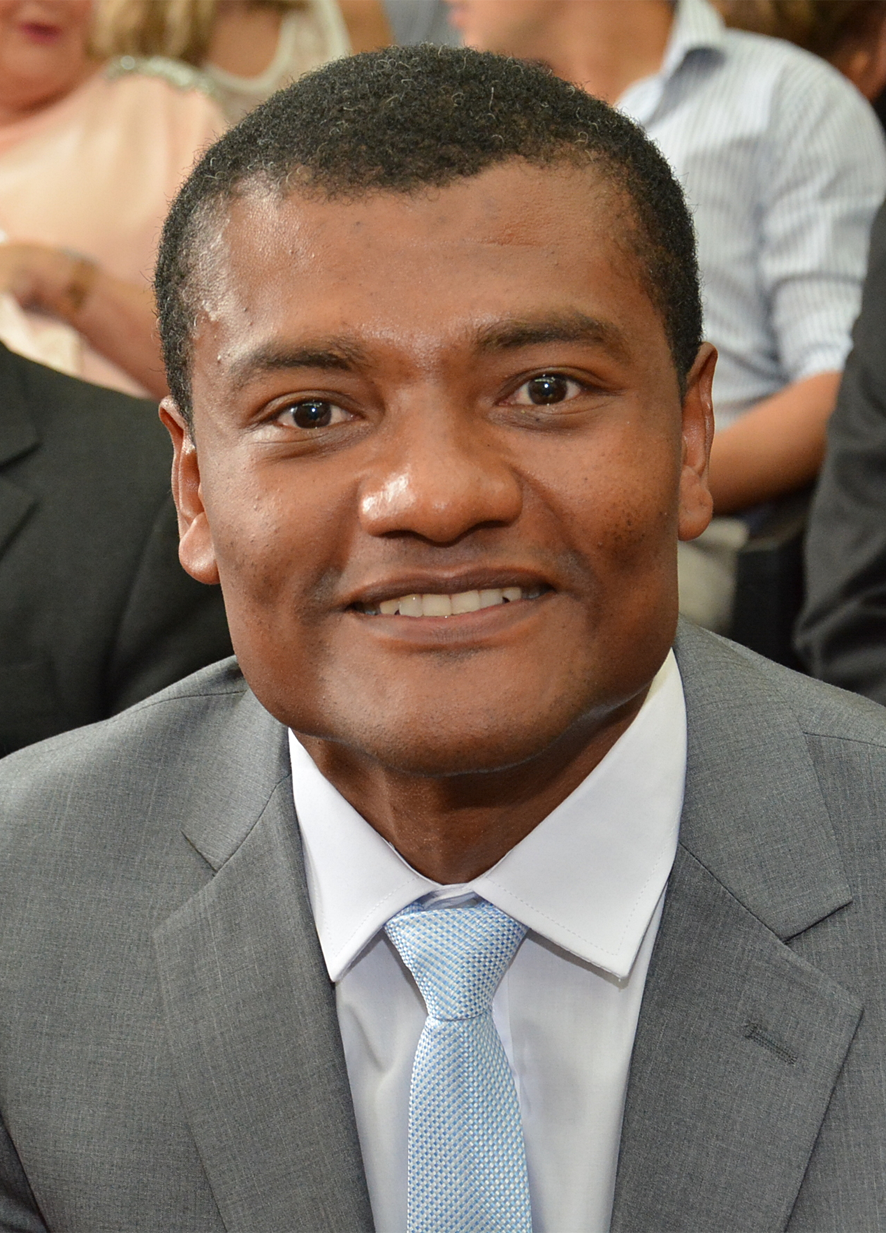

Provincial Deputy of Salta
- Incumbent
- Assumed office 24 November 2021
- Constituency: Capital Department

Personal details
- Born: 4 September 1980 (age 45) Salta, Argentina
- Party: Victory Party (2015–2017); Memory and Movilization (since 2017)

Jesús David Battaglia Leiva (born 19 July 1978), better known as David Leiva, is an Argentine cumbia singer and politician, currently serving as a member of the Chamber of Deputies of Salta representing the Capital Department.

== Early life ==
Leiva was born and raised in the Castañares neighborhood of Salta, capital of the homonymous Salta Province, son of Aidé Leiva, a school teacher. He and his two brothers were largely raised by their working-class grandparents, Ángel Battaglia and María de La Parra, whom Leiva considers his adoptive parents. Battaglia was a railway worker and later worked as a butcher.

Leiva became interested in music from an early age. His mother was a lover of tango, and he cites Michael Jackson as an early influence. In Castañares he became friends with Claudio Zotelo, with whom he would go on to form cumbia group Juveniles Panda. Juveniles Panda found local success and later toured the Argentine Northwest during the 90s.

== Political career ==
Leiva became politically active through music, as he and his bandmates raised money for various social causes alongside other local artists such as Los Nocheros and Chaqueño Palavecino.

In 2015, he ran for a seat in the Salta City Council as part of the Victory Party. He won the party primaries with 7,912 votes, and later became the second-most voted candidate in the general election. The Victory Party's total 42,121 votes were enough to elect Leiva and three other candidates in the party list to the 2015–2017 term.

Leiva sought the re-election in 2017 as part of the local Memory and Movilization party. He received 38,459 votes, enough to grant him a seat behind the most-voted candidate, Matías Cánepa. During his second term in the council, he was elected by his peers as First Vice President of the council, deputising for Cánepa. His candidacy was backed by all represented parties save for those of the Workers' Party.

Ahead of the 2019 local elections, Leiva announced his intention to run for mayor of Salta as part of the Frente de Todos coalition. He won the primary election with 23,507 votes. He went on to lose the general election against Salta Nos Une candidate Bettina Romero, who won 52.6% of the vote against the Leiva's 27%.

In the 2021 provincial election, he was elected to the Chamber of Deputies of Salta as part of the coalition backing incumbent governor Gustavo Sáenz, a former opponent of Leiva's. As a provincial deputy, Leiva introduced legislation to create municipal security centers and to guarantee gender equality within provincial institutions. He has also supported a potential reform of the Salta city constitution.
