= San Felipe, Salta =

Coordinates: 25°43′12″S 64°54′14″W

San Felipe
- Municipality and village
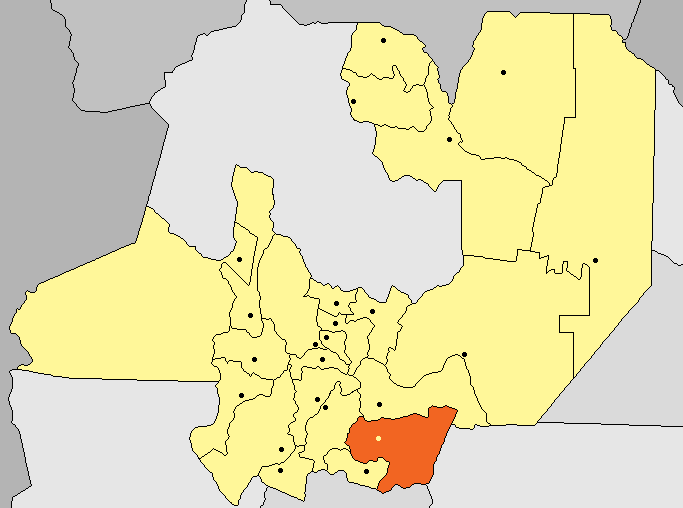
- Within Rosario de la Frontera Department
- Country: Argentina
- Province: Salta Province
- Department: Rosario de la Frontera
- Locality: San Felipe

Population (2001)
  - Total: 112
- Time zone: UTC−3 (ART)
- Postal code: A4198
- Area code: 03786

San Felipe is a village and rural municipality in Salta Province in northwestern Argentina.
