= La Mesada, Salta =

La Mesada
- Village
- Interactive map of La Mesada
- Coordinates: 22°41′7″S 65°7′12″W
- Country: Argentina
- Province: Salta Province
- Department: Iruya Department
- Time zone: UTC−3 (ART)

La Mesada is a village in northwestern Argentina. It is part of the Iruya Department in Salta Province, located northeast of the village of Iruya at 3,000 m altitude on the Cordillera Oriental on the Nazareno River. La Mesada consists of the two districts of La Mesada Grande and La Mesada Chica.

La Mesada has the status of a civil association called Centro de La Aborigen Mesada Grande (center of the indigenous inhabitants of La Mesada Grande). The village has a small, scarcely equipped hospital, a primary school and a parish and cultivates corn and potatoes for their own use.

From Iruya the village of La Mesada can be reached through a valley along the Nazareno River, which has to be crossed several times. With off-road vehicles this is possible in the months from April to November. In the summer months from December to March, the river carries too much water, so that the only possibility to reach the village is over the considerably longer mountain trails. The final part of the way into town can only be made on foot or with mounts.
