= Iruya =

- Town in Salta Province, Argentina
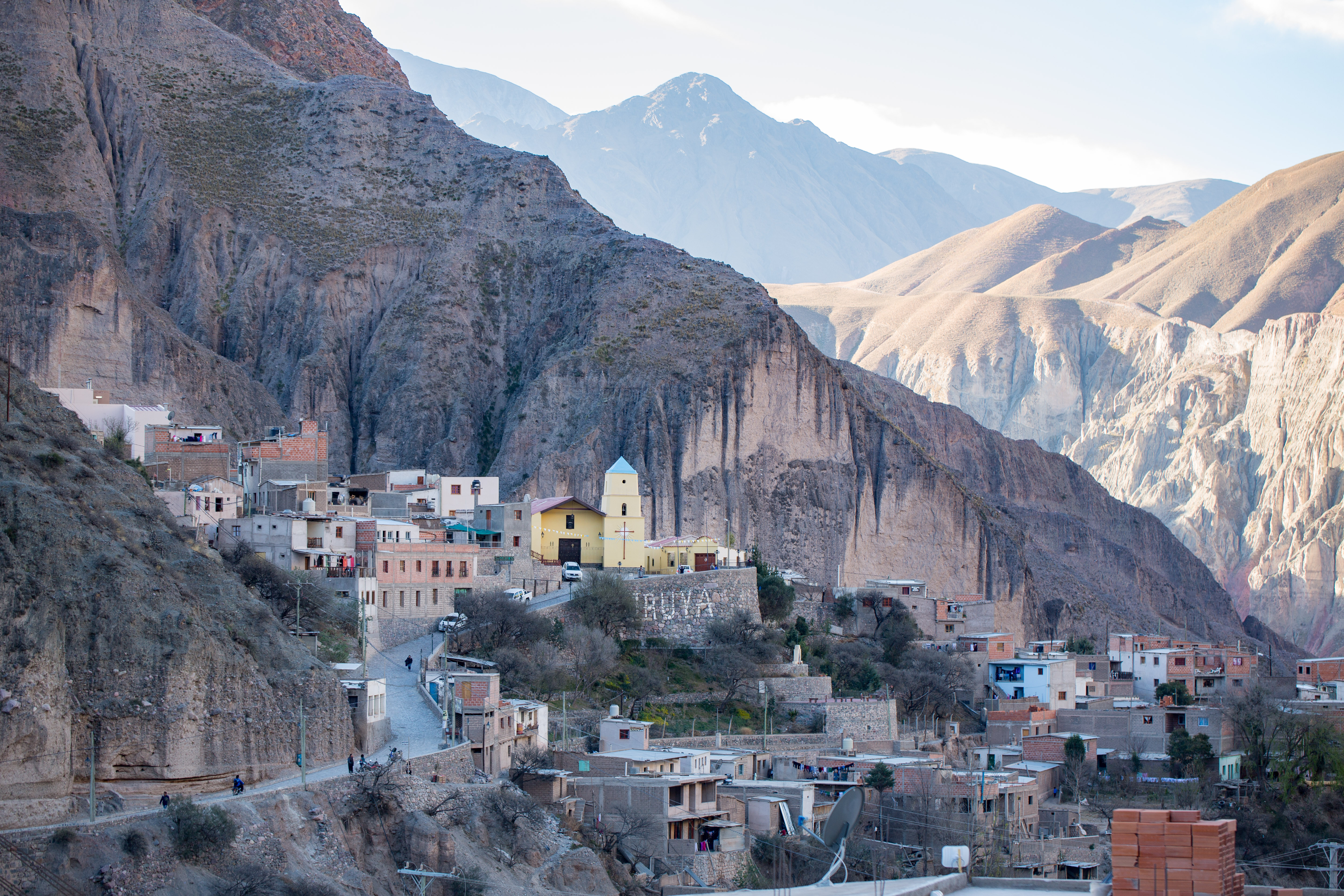
- View of Iruya

- Location of Iruya in Argentina. Iruya (Argentina)
- Coordinates: 22.791585°S 65.216361°W
- Founded: 1753
- Elevation: 2,780 m (9,120 ft)

Population (2010)
  - Total: 1,523
  - Density: 1.66/km^{2} (4.3/sq mi)
- Time zone: UTC−3 (ART)

Iruya is a small town of population 1,070 in northwestern Argentina. It is located in the Salta Province of northwestern Argentina, and is the capital of the Iruya Department.

== Overview ==
Located in the altiplano region along the Iruya River, Iruya sits nestled against the mountainside at an elevation of 2,780 meters (9,120 feet). It is located over 300 kilometers (190 mi) from the province capital of Salta. There is no direct road connection to the rest of the Salta province and access is through a road to the adjacent Jujuy province, a 50 km (31 mi) portion of which is unpaved. Nonetheless, the town is popular with tourists for its scenic location and townscape and friendly locals. 8 km north of Iruya there is the village of San Isidro, 7 km north there is the village of San Juan, 6 km south there is the village of Pueblo Viejo.

Iruya's name is derived from the Quechua language, meaning "abundance of straw".

== History ==
Iruya was officially founded in 1753, but the first inhabitants settled here around 100 years earlier. They were mainly aboriginals of which the oldest roots go back to the Ocloyas, a people belonging to the ethnic group of the Kolla who stem from the Kollasuyo, which used to be one of the four regions of the Inca empire.

Iruya's church was built in 1690.

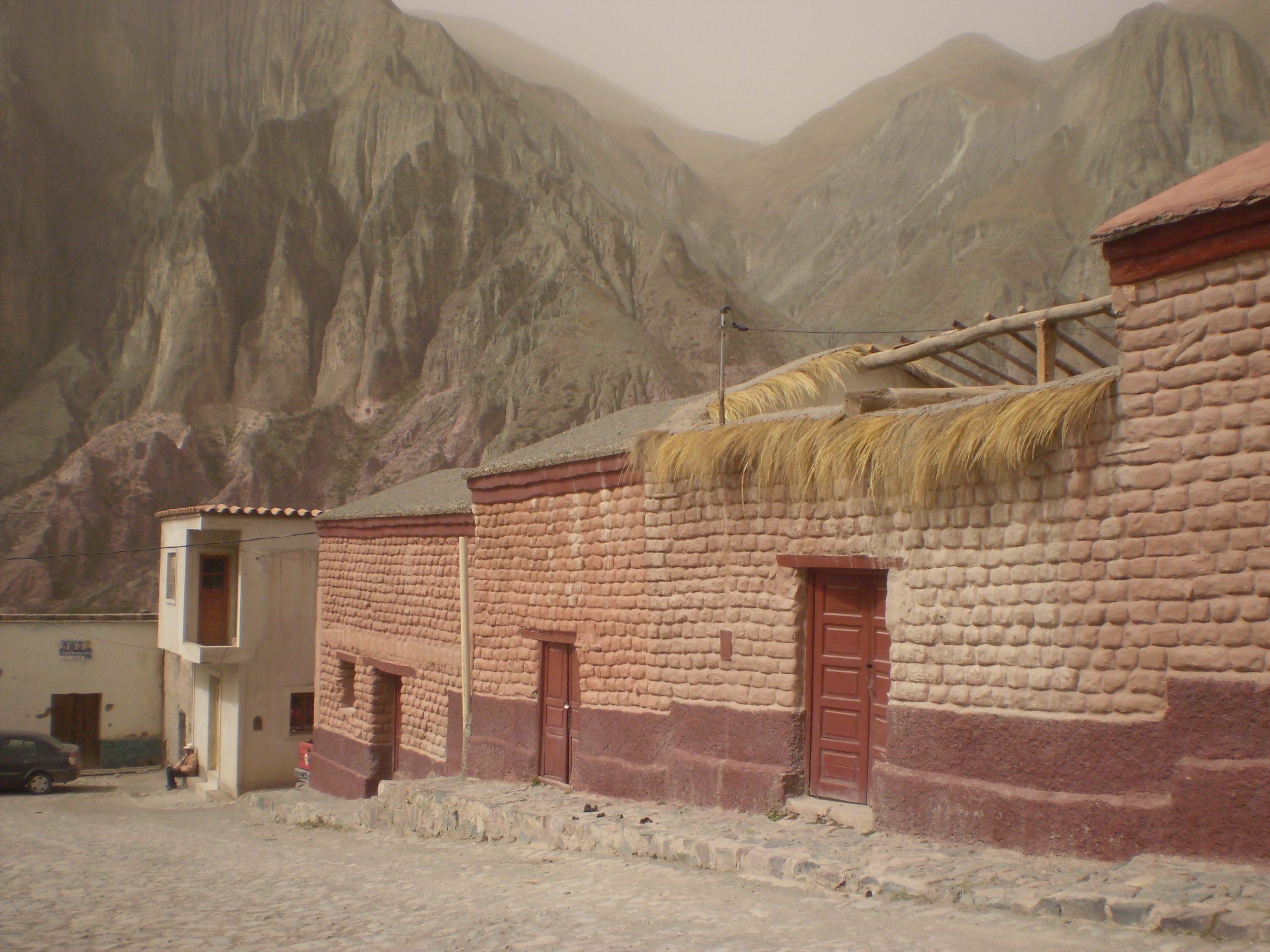

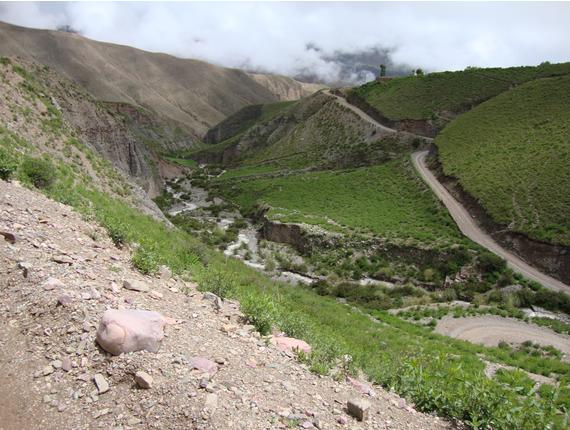

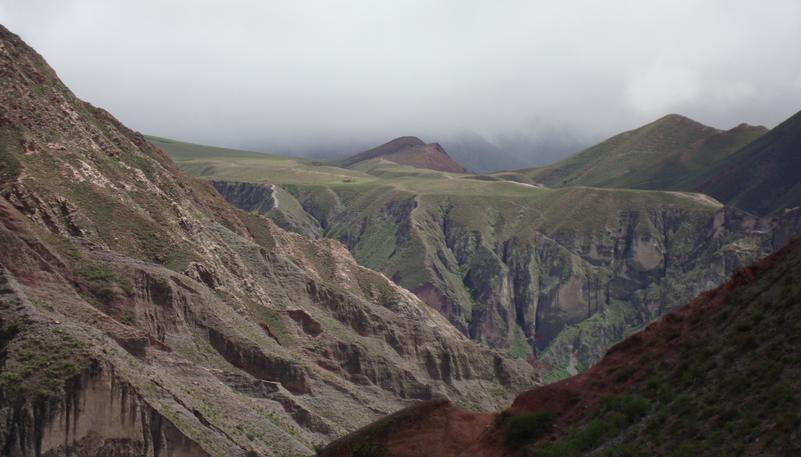
Pantipampa

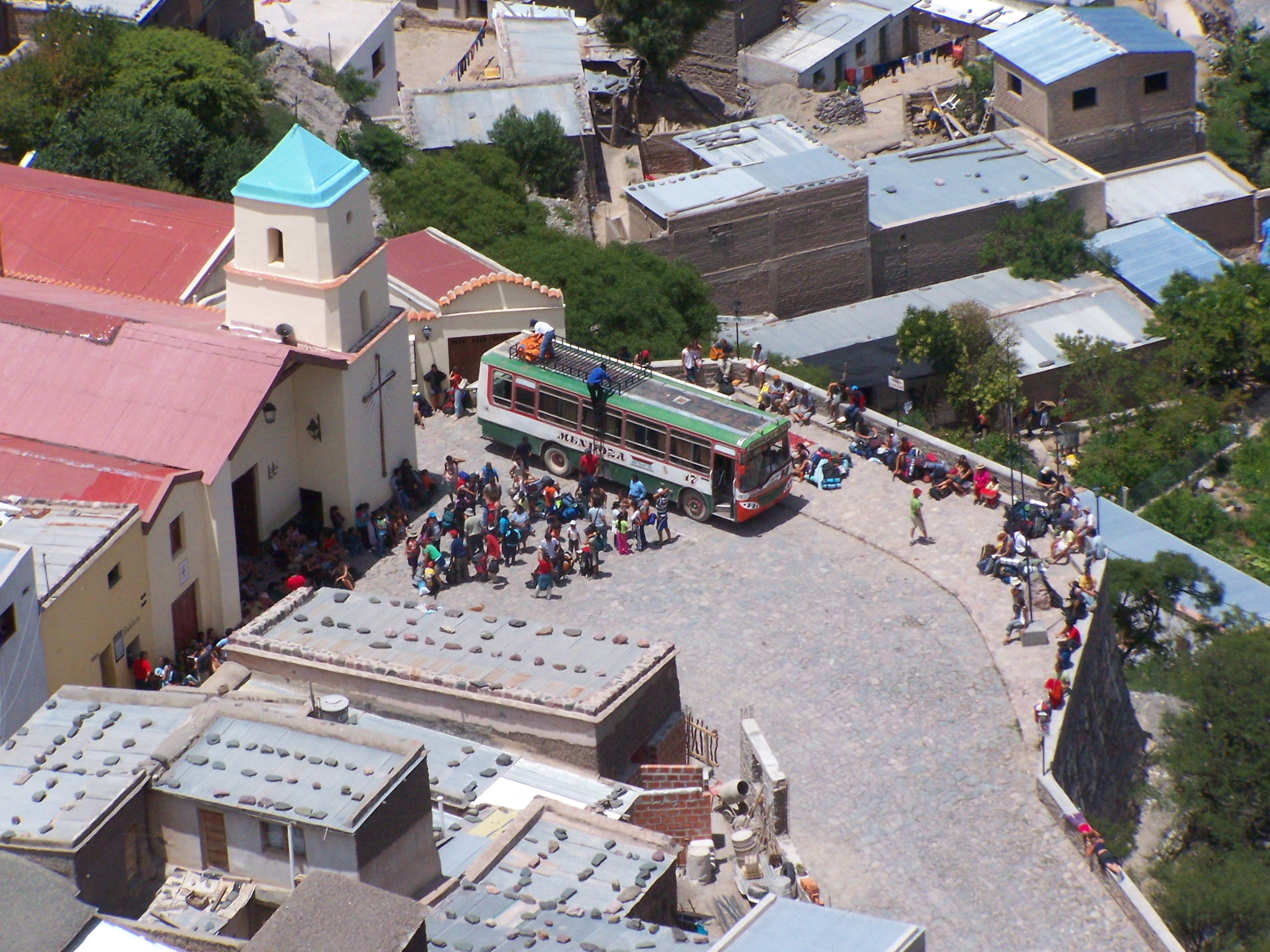

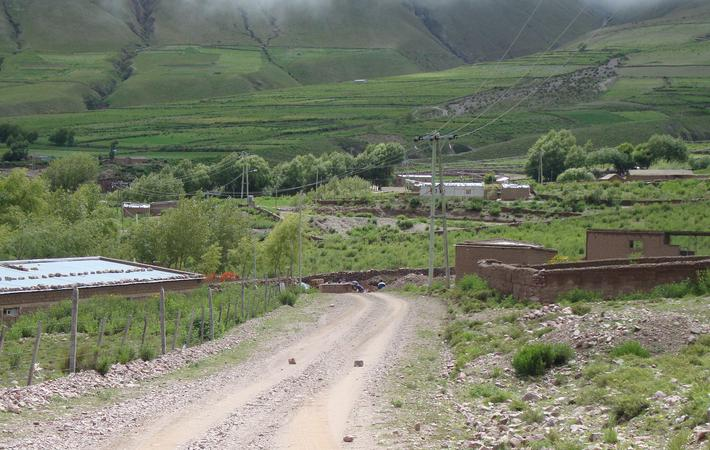
Río Grande

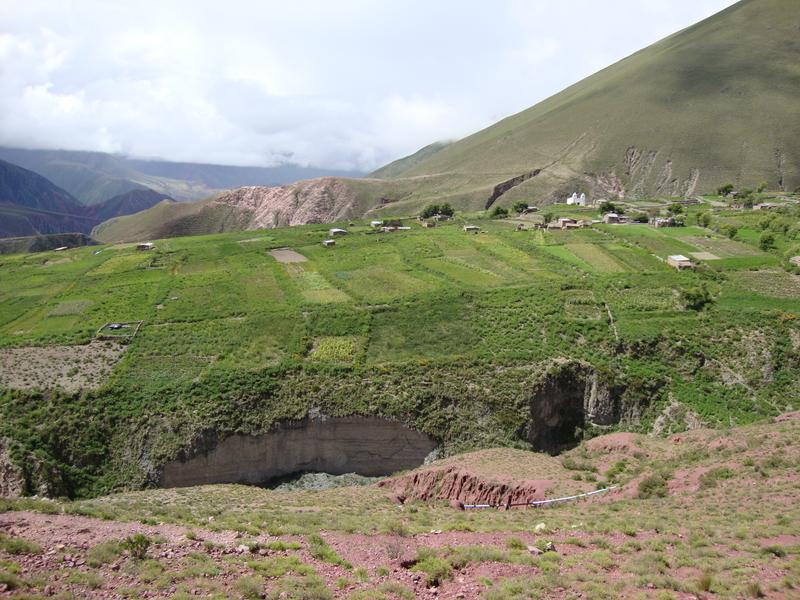
Pueblo viejo

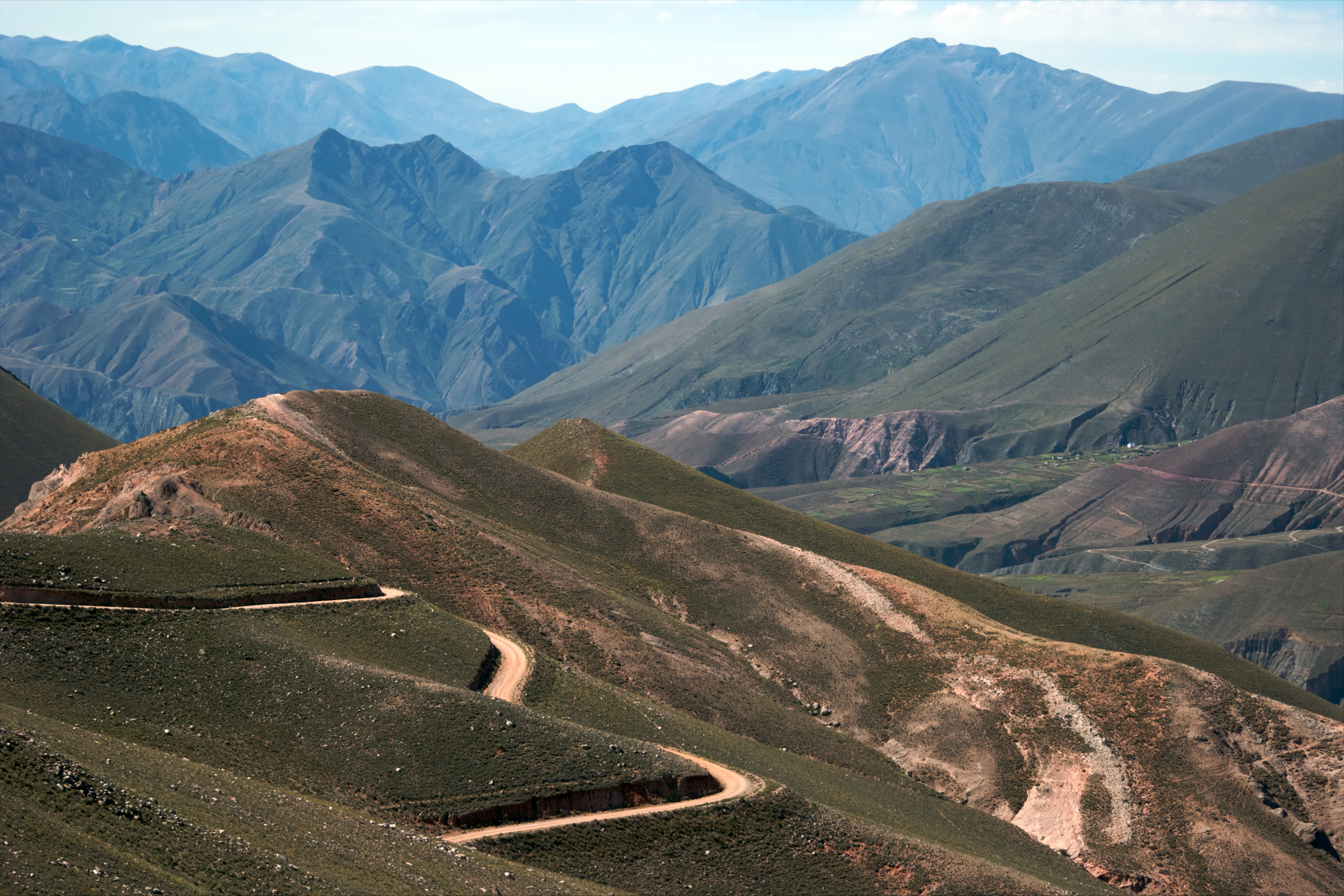

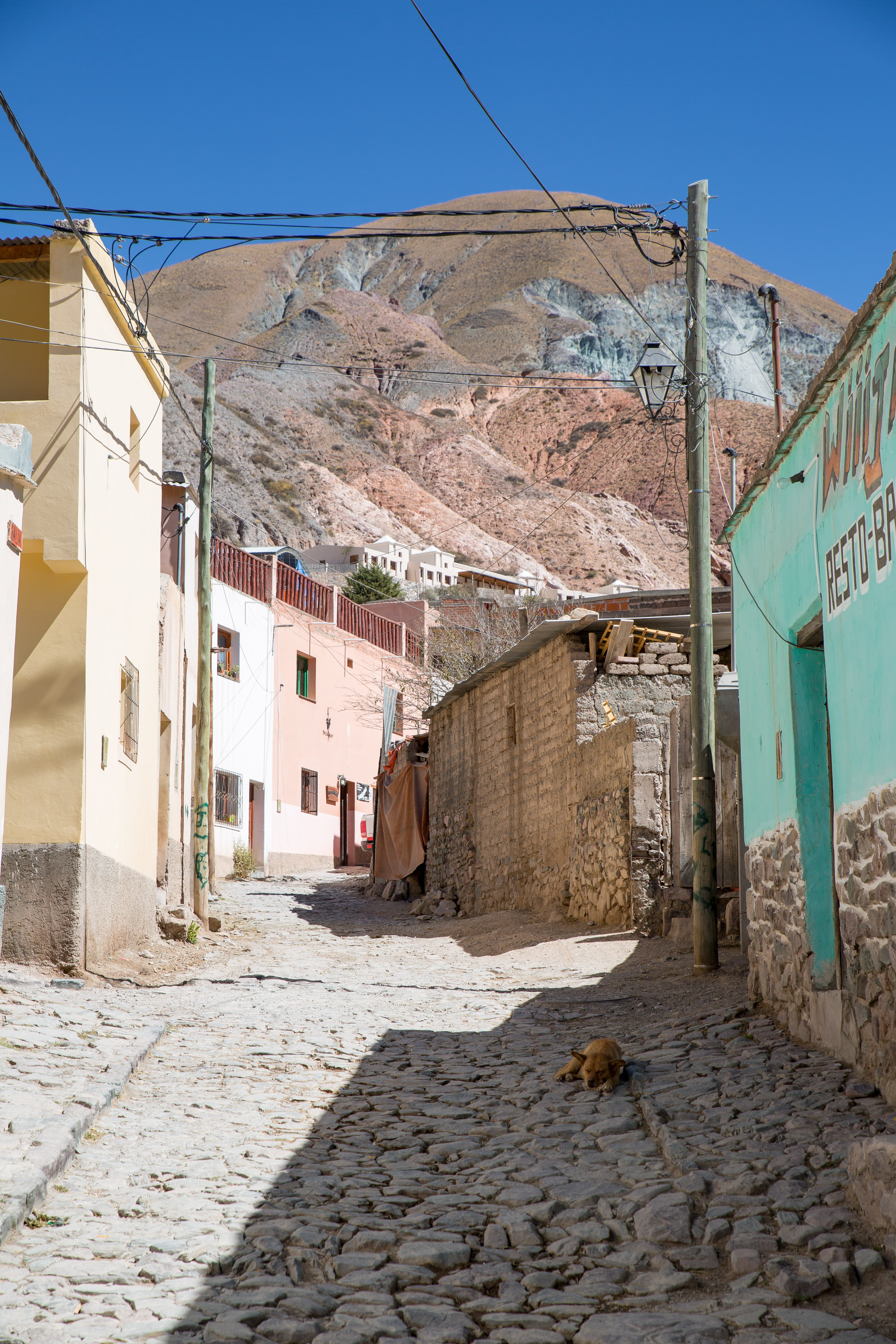
A dog sleeps in the streets of Iruya

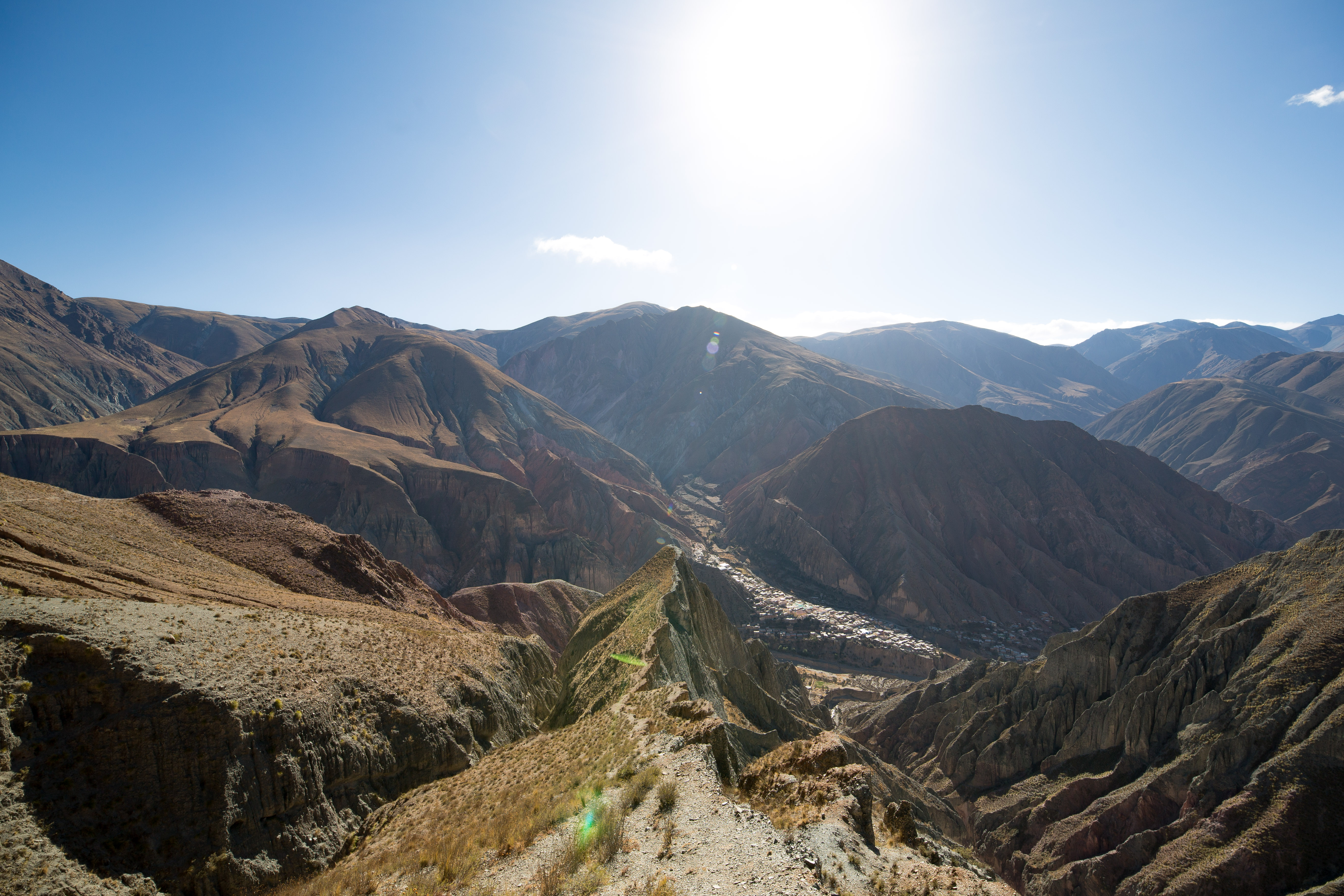
Iruya seen from above

== Climate ==
Climate data for Colanzulí, Iruya (1993–2013)
Month	Jan	Feb	Mar	Apr	May	Jun	Jul	Aug	Sep	Oct	Nov	Dec	Year
Record high °C (°F)	26.0 (78.8)	27.0 (80.6)	26.0 (78.8)	25.7 (78.3)	23.0 (73.4)	22.0 (71.6)	22.3 (72.1)	25.0 (77.0)	25.0 (77.0)	26.0 (78.8)	26.0 (78.8)	25.6 (78.1)	27.0 (80.6)
Mean daily maximum °C (°F)	15.6 (60.1)	15.5 (59.9)	16.0 (60.8)	17.3 (63.1)	16.4 (61.5)	15.7 (60.3)	15.3 (59.5)	16.6 (61.9)	17.3 (63.1)	17.5 (63.5)	17.0 (62.6)	16.8 (62.2)	16.4 (61.5)
Daily mean °C (°F)	10.2 (50.4)	9.7 (49.5)	9.8 (49.6)	9.7 (49.5)	8.2 (46.8)	7.6 (45.7)	7.2 (45.0)	8.1 (46.6)	8.8 (47.8)	9.5 (49.1)	10.0 (50.0)	10.6 (51.1)	9.1 (48.4)
Mean daily minimum °C (°F)	5.2 (41.4)	4.8 (40.6)	4.5 (40.1)	3.2 (37.8)	1.3 (34.3)	0.6 (33.1)	0.1 (32.2)	0.8 (33.4)	1.6 (34.9)	2.9 (37.2)	3.9 (39.0)	4.8 (40.6)	2.8 (37.0)
Record low °C (°F)	1.0 (33.8)	−1.0 (30.2)	−1.0 (30.2)	−3.6 (25.5)	−6.0 (21.2)	−11.0 (12.2)	−11.0 (12.2)	−9.8 (14.4)	−10.0 (14.0)	−6.0 (21.2)	−4.0 (24.8)	−1.0 (30.2)	−11.0 (12.2)
Average precipitation mm (inches)	70.2 (2.76)	60.1 (2.37)	39.5 (1.56)	9.5 (0.37)	0.1 (0.00)	0.0 (0.0)	0.0 (0.0)	1.2 (0.05)	1.7 (0.07)	7.5 (0.30)	12.8 (0.50)	35.3 (1.39)	237.9 (9.37)
Source: Red Hidrológica Nacional

== See also ==
- Chiyayoc
- La Mesada
