= Gastón González =

Gastón González may refer to:

- Gastón González (footballer, born 1988), Argentine midfielder
- Gastón González (footballer, born 1996), Argentine forward
- Gastón González (footballer, born 2001), Argentine midfielder
