= Isla de Cañas =

Isla de Cañas may refer to:

- Isla de Cañas, Argentina
- Isla de Cañas, Los Santos, Panama
