= Pueblo Viejo, Salta =

Pueblo Viejo
- Village
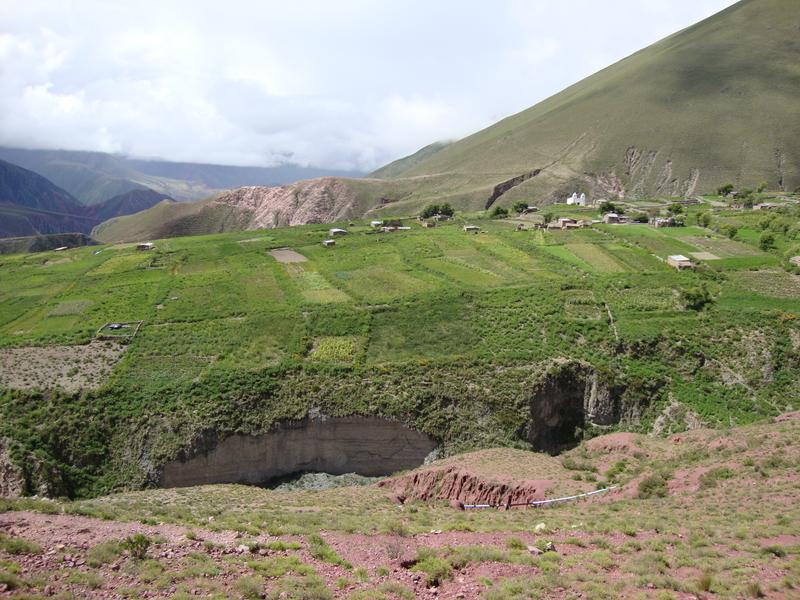
- Interactive map of Pueblo Viejo
- Coordinates: 22°50′15″S 65°12′50″W
- Country: Argentina
- Province: Salta Province
- Department: Iruya Department
- Time zone: UTC−3 (ART)

Pueblo Viejo (Spanish, 'old village') is a small village in the Iruya Department in Salta Province in northwestern Argentina. It is located near the village Iruya and is connected through dirt road Ruta Provincial 165-S with Campo Carreras, which is a locality of the village Rodeo Colanzulí.

Pueblo Viejo is part of Finca Santiago, the first community property in Argentina. It has about 190 inhabitants (2001 census). This represents an increase of 12.5% compared to the 1991 census (168 people). The village thrives on agriculture, mainly small animal husbandry, and tourism. Furthermore, there is a small handicraft business.

In the center there is a school called "Congreso de Tucumán", a health station and a chapel which was rebuilt in the 1990s by the residents of Pueblo Viejo.

According to historical records, Pueblo Viejo is the oldest village in the Iruya Department. It is assumed that the first inhabitants of the region around Iruya settled in this place.

== Location ==
A part of the trail to Pueblo Viejo can be made from Iruya by bus on Ruta Provincial 133. The bus stops at Toroyoc, about 6 km from Iruya.

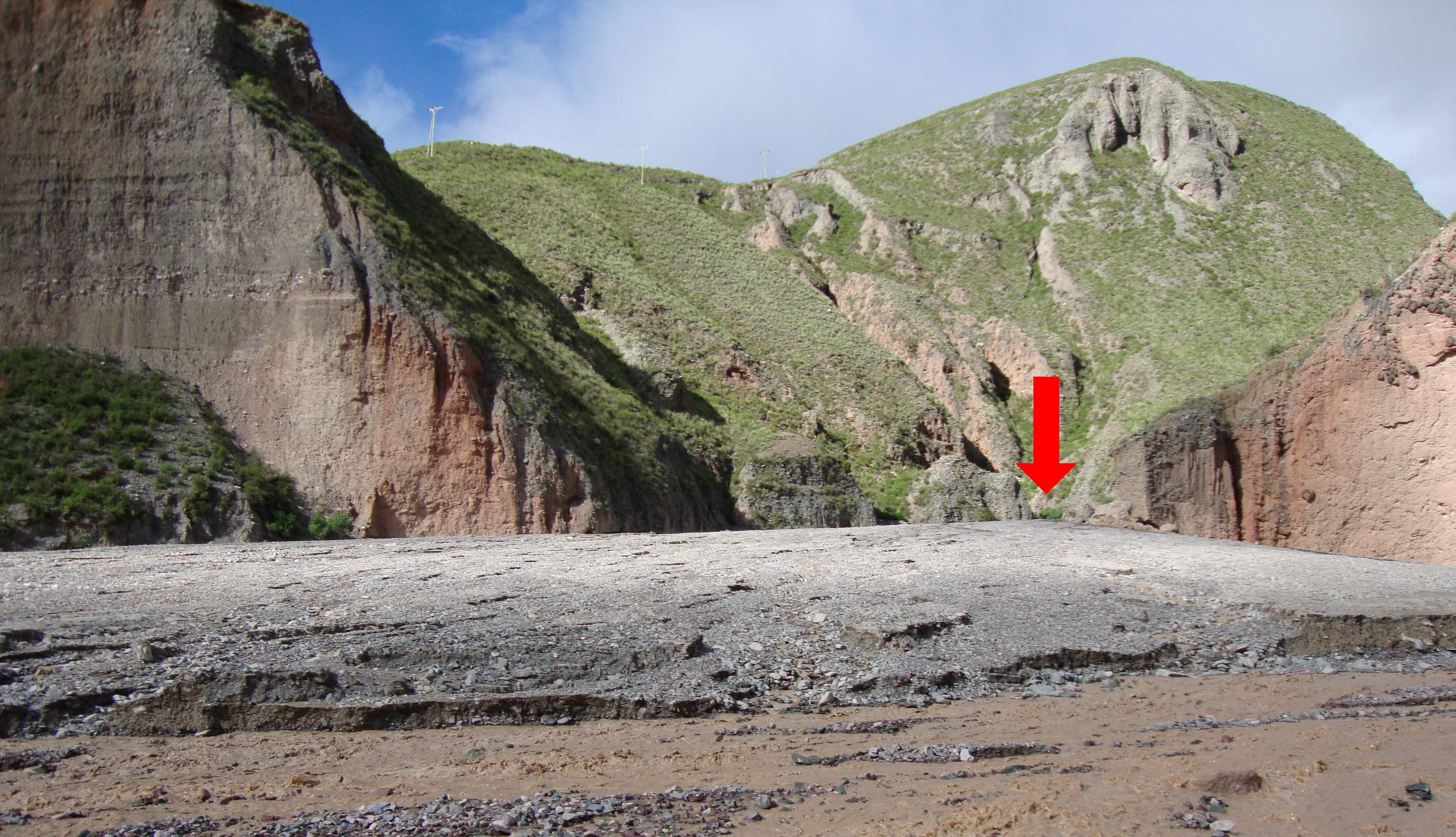
Beginning of trail (see arrow)

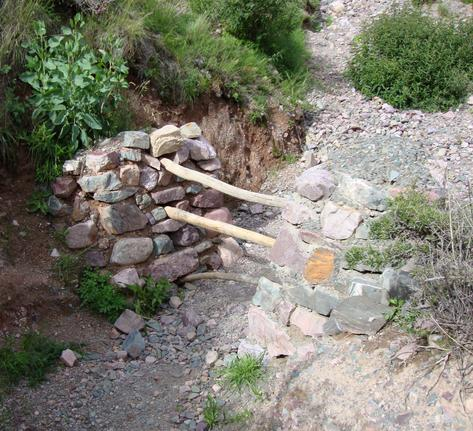
Entrance of trail

From there, on the opposite side of the river at a non-marked and not easily identifiable location (position: 22°50′24.5″S 65°13′33″W), a steep walk of about half an hour leads up to the village.

Alternatively, Pueblo Viejo can be reached from the adjacent village of Campo Carreras along the unpaved road Ruta Provincial 165-S. In the months of November to April this can often only be done by walking or by using off-road vehicles, as part of the trail may be under water.
