= Chicoana Department =

Chicoana
- Department
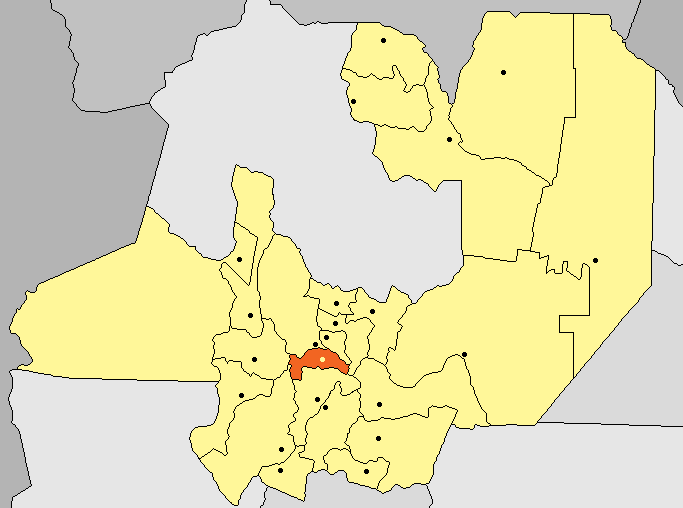
- Coordinates: 25°6′9″S 65°32′7″W
- Country: Argentina
- Province: Salta

Area
  - Total: 910 km^{2} (350 sq mi)

Population (2010)
  - Total: 18,248
  - Density: 20/km^{2} (52/sq mi)

Chicoana is a department located in Salta Province, in northwestern Argentina.

With an area of 910 km^{2} (351 sq mi) it is one of the smallest departments of the province. It borders to the north with the departments of Cerrillos, and Rosario de Lerma, to the east with Capital Department, to the south with La Viña and to the west with the departments of Cachi and San Carlos.

== Towns and municipalities ==
- Chicoana
- El Carril
- Escoipe
- Viñaco
- Calvimonte
- Agua Negra
- El Maray
- El Nogalar
- La Zanja
- Pulares
- San Fernando de Escoipe
- San Martín
- El moyar
- Chivilme
- Bella vista
- Los Los
- Peñaflor
- Potrero de Díaz
