= Ampascachi =

Coordinates: 25°20′S 65°32′W

- Municipality and village
- Country: Argentina
- Province: Salta Province
- Department: La Viña
- Elevation: 3,950 ft (1,204 m)

Population (2001)
  - Total: 185
- Time zone: UTC−3 (ART)
- Postal code: 4421
- Area code: 0387
- Climate: Cwa

Ampascachi is a village and rural municipality in Salta Province in northwestern Argentina.

== Population ==
Ampascachi had 185 inhabitants (INDEC, 2001), representing a decrease of 45% compared to the 339 inhabitants (INDEC, 1991) from the previous census.
