= Gastón González (footballer, born 1996) =

Argentine footballer

Personal information
- Full name: Gastón Raul González
- Date of birth: 6 October 1996 (age 30)
- Place of birth: Güemes, Argentina
- Position: Forward

Senior career*
Years	Team	Apps	(Gls)
2017	Gimnasia y Esgrima	2	(0)
2017	Argentino	10	(1)
2018	Juventud Antoniana	0	(0)
- * Club domestic league appearances and goals

Gastón Raul González (born 6 October 1996) is an Argentine footballer who plays as a forward.

== Career ==
González, like father and uncle, began his career with Gimnasia y Esgrima. He made his professional debut on 23 April 2017 against Guillermo Brown, being substituted on for the final minutes of a 1–0 defeat in Primera B Nacional. He participated again three months later versus Instituto as the club finished eighteenth in 2016–17. González left Gimnasia y Esgrima on 28 August, signing for Argentino of Primera C Metropolitana. One goal and ten matches followed, with the forward then leaving in December. He had a trial with Italian Prima Categoria side Palestrina in January 2018. In the succeeding July, González joined Juventud Antoniana. He terminated his contract in October.

== Personal life ==
González is the son of Alejandro González, nephew of Fabián González and first cousin of Alfredo González, all three being former professional footballers.

== Career statistics ==
As of 18 August 2019.

Club statistics
Club	Season	League			Cup		League Cup		Continental		Other		Total	
Club	Season	Division	Apps	Goals	Apps	Goals	Apps	Goals	Apps	Goals	Apps	Goals	Apps	Goals
Gimnasia y Esgrima	2016–17	Primera B Nacional	2	0	0	0	—		—		0	0	2	0
Argentino	2017–18	Primera C Metropolitana	10	1	0	0	—		—		0	0	10	1
Juventud Antoniana	2018–19	Torneo Federal A	0	0	0	0	—		—		0	0	0	0
Career total			12	1	0	0	—		—		0	0	12	1
