= La Caldera =

- Municipality and town
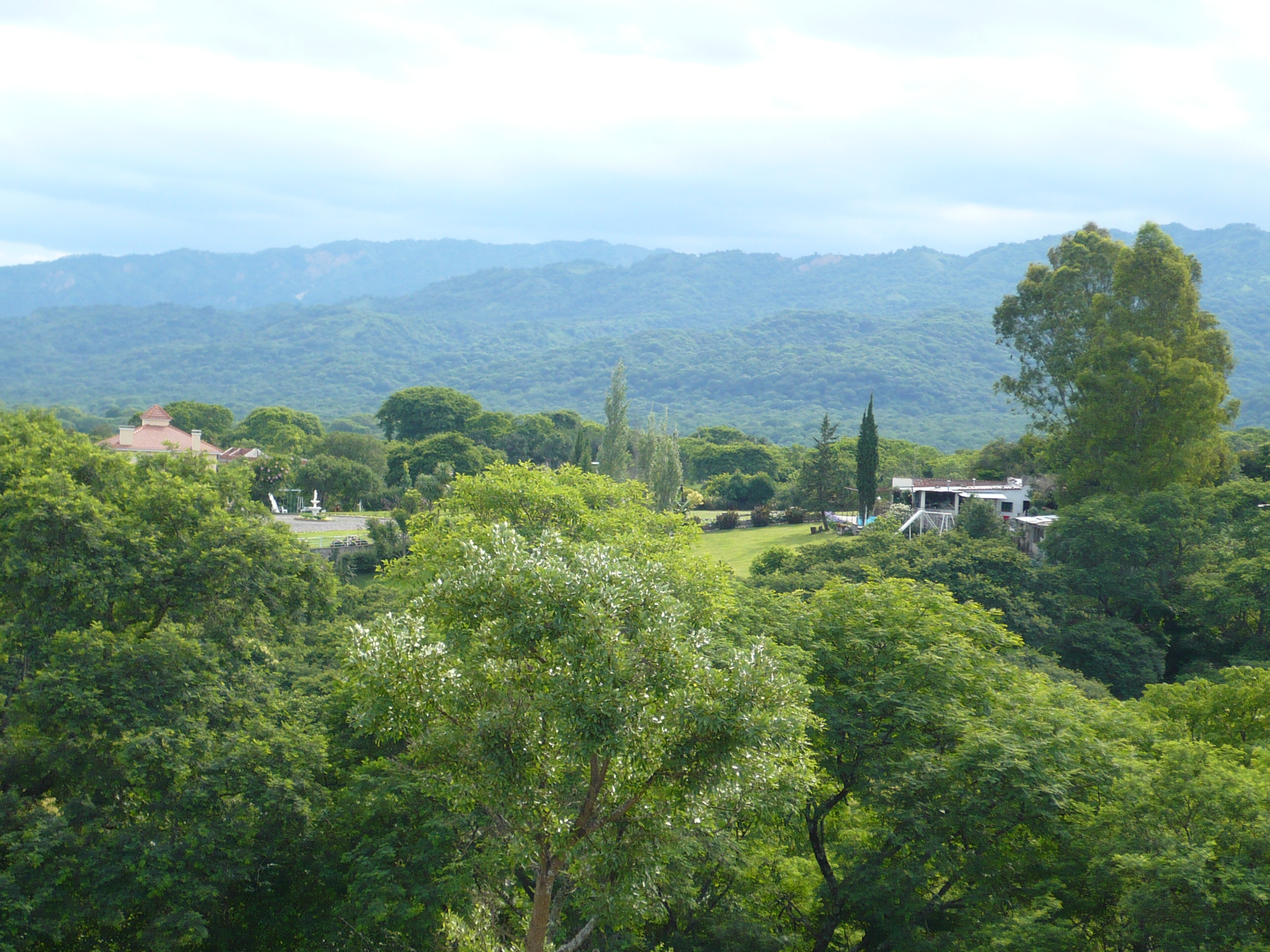
- View of the La Caldera Valley

- Location within Salta Province Location within Argentina
- Coordinates: 24°36′00″S 65°23′00″W
- Country: Argentina
- Province: Salta
- Department: La Caldera
- Time zone: UTC−3 (ART)
- Climate: Cwb

La Caldera is a small town and municipality in Salta Province in northwestern Argentina. It is located 25 km north of the city of Salta.
