= Gustavo Sáenz =

Argentine politician

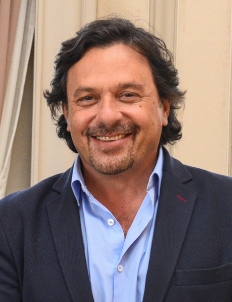

Governor of Salta
- Incumbent
- Assumed office 10 December 2019
- Vice Governor: Antonio Marocco
- Preceded by: Juan Manuel Urtubey

Mayor of Salta
- In office 9 December 2015 – 9 December 2019
- Preceded by: Miguel Isa
- Succeeded by: Bettina Romero

Provincial Senator of Salta
- In office 10 December 2009 – 10 December 2013
- Preceded by: Fernando Yarade
- Succeeded by: Gabriela Cerrano
- Constituency: Capital Department

Personal details
- Born: 14 April 1969 (age 57) Salta, Argentina
- Party: Justicialist Party (1995–2015); Salta Identity (2015–present)
- Education: Catholic University of Salta

Gustavo Adolfo Ruberto-Sáenz (born 14 April 1969), better known as Gustavo Sáenz, is an Argentine politician who is currently governor of Salta Province, since 10 December 2019. Previously, from 2015 to 2019, he was intendente (mayor) of the City of Salta, and served from 2009 to 2013 as a member of the Provincial Senate representing the Capital Department.

Sáenz is the founder and leader of the Salta Identity Party (PAIS).

== Early life and education ==
Gustavo Adolfo Ruberto-Sáenz was born on 14 April 1969 in Salta, the capital city of the homonymous Salta Province. He finished high school at the Bachillerato Humanista Moderno (like fellow governors Juan Manuel Urtubey and Juan Carlos Romero) and then studied law at the Catholic University of Salta (UCASAL).

== Political career ==
In 1995 Sáenz was elected to the Salta City Council for the Justicialist Party, serving until 2003. He also worked in the city government under mayor Miguel Isa, serving as Isa's chief of cabinet and government secretary. Sáenz served a second term in the city council from 2007 to 2009, during which he was the council's chairman.

In 2009, Sáenz was elected to the Provincial Senate in the Capital Department, succeeding Fernando Yarade. As senator, Sáenz hosted a radio show called "El senador y la gente" ("The Senator and the People"). He ran for re-election in 2013, but lost to Workers' Party candidate Gabriela Cerrano.

Following his defeat, Sáenz took a brief hiatus from politics from 2013 to 2015, during which he continued to host a radio talk show. Ahead of the 2015 election, Sáenz formed a new party, the Salta Identity Party (Partido Identidad Salteña; PAIS) to run for the mayoralty of Salta. Backed by the United for a New Alternative alliance, Sáenz won against the Front for Victory's Javier David. Shortly after his win, Sáenz was selected by presidential candidate Sergio Massa to run in his ticket in the general election as the vice presidential candidate; the Massa-Sáenz ticket placed third in the general election and Sáenz took office as mayor of Salta on 9 December 2015.

Sáenz ran for the governorship of Salta Province in the 2019 general election, forming the Frente Sáenz Gobernador with his Salta Identity Party and other provincial parties, and receiving the backing of then-governor Juan Manuel Urtubey; he won the election and took office on 10 December 2019.

Political offices
Preceded by Miguel Isa	Mayor of Salta; 2015–2019	Succeeded by Bettina Romero
Preceded by Juan Manuel Urtubey	Governor of Salta; 2019–present	Incumbent
