= La Viña, Salta =

Coordinates: 25°27′S 65°35′W

La Viña (Salta)
- Municipality and village
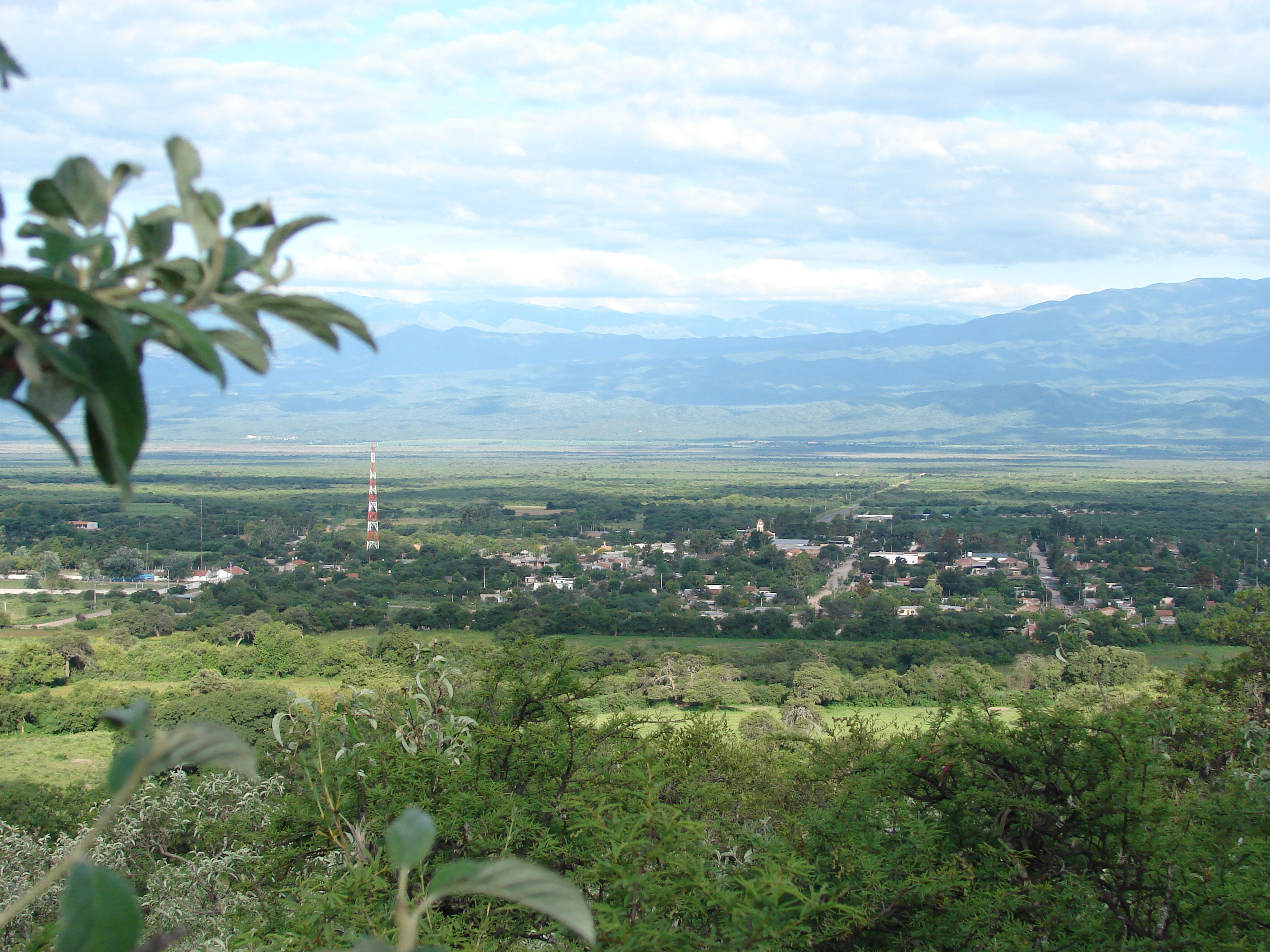
- Interactive map of La Viña (Salta)
- Country: Argentina
- Province: Salta
- Department: La Viña
- Time zone: UTC−3 (ART)
- Climate: BSk

La Viña (Salta) is a village and rural municipality in Salta Province in northwestern Argentina.
