= Luis Chocobar =

Argentine police officer (born 1987)

Luis Oscar Chocobar
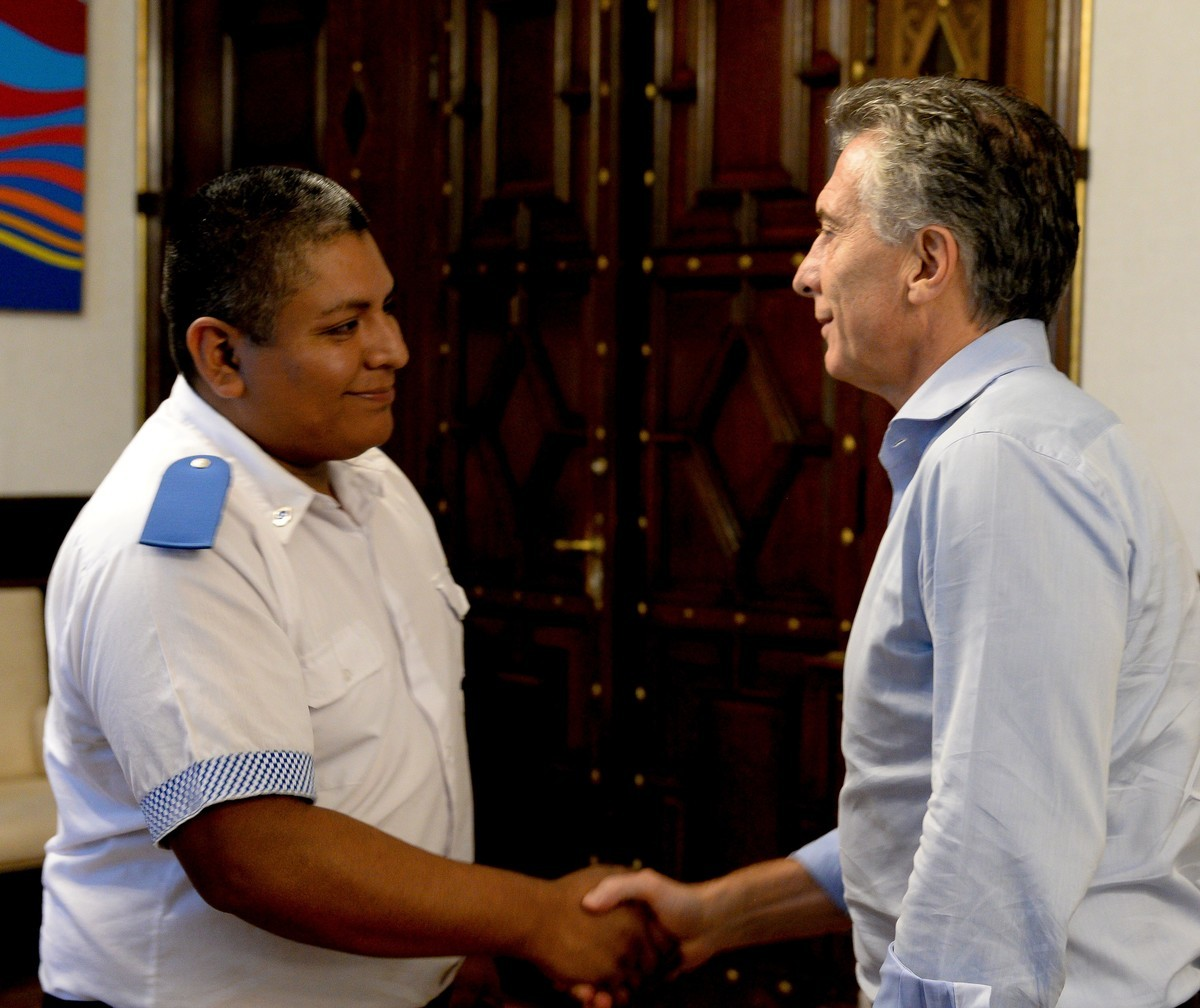
- Chocobar with then-President Mauricio Macri in Casa Rosada, 2018
- Born: Luis Oscar Chocobar; 26 May 1987 (age 39); La Merced, Salta Province, Argentina
- Children: 1
- Conviction: Homicide with excessive use of force (Note: Conviction annulled in May 2024.)
- Penalty: 2 years in prison (suspended) (Note: In May 2024, the Court of Cassation of Buenos Aires annulled Chocobar's conviction and sentence, ordering a new trial which is expected to begin in 2026.)

Luis Oscar Chocobar (born 26 May 1987) is an Argentine former police officer, known for the killing of a teenage boy during a chase after the latter stabbed a US tourist in La Boca neighborhood of Buenos Aires on 8 December 2017.

Following the incident, Chocobar was hailed as a hero by President Mauricio Macri and Security Secretary Patricia Bullrich, inspiring the Chocobar doctrine, approved by Bullrich, which expanded the rights of police officers to use lethal force.

In May 2021, Chocobar was sentenced to a suspended two years' imprisonment and five years of suspension as a police officer. He did not serve time in prison due to the lightness of the sentence and his lawyers appealed for acquittal. In May 2024, the Court of Cassation in Buenos Aires annulled Chocobar's conviction, ordering a new trial. The second trial is expected to begin in 2026, with Chocobar's defense asking for acquittal before trial alleging double jeopardy.

== Background ==
Chocobar was born on 26 May 1987 in La Merced, Salta. He was recognized by his mother at the age of 15 in 2002 and changed his surname to hers that same year. He spent time at a reformatory and later lived with his grandparents. He has two brothers and five step-siblings on behalf of his mother. He also worked in the Salta countryside since age 11 and became increasingly interested in becoming a police officer. When he turned 18 in 2005, he moved to Buenos Aires. He had obtained a scholarship to study to become an accountant but he abandoned this after he failed in mathematics, according to his own account.

Before being interested in becoming a police officer, he worked textile shops, at Chinese supermarkets, cleaned public restrooms in the neighborhood of Puerto Madero and also worked as a janitor.

At age 27, in 2015, he enrolled at the Avellaneda, Buenos Aires Local Police.

He has a daughter from a former marriage and now lives with his girlfriend.

== Incident ==
On 8 December 2017, 57-year-old American tourist Frank Joe Wolek was stabbed seven times during a robbery in the neighborhood of La Boca, Buenos Aires city. Bystanders caught the delinquents (17 and 18 years old) and retrieved the stolen camera. Chocobar, who had just left home to take service, immediately responded to the incident; identified himself as a policeman, gave the order of surrender to the delinquents, called for back-up and informed 9-1-1. Then he ran after the two criminals. The younger of them escaped, so Chocobar pursued the other. After a short chase, Chocobar reiterated his order to stop to the 18-year-old robber, who dropped his coat, and continued with his escape holding his knife. At this time, Chocobar opened fire, shooting three times to the air and ordering the criminal to surrender. Instead, the young man kept on running. Then the policeman shot twice, hitting the delinquent in the back of one leg and one buttock. Some criminal scene investigations say the bullets ricochetted. The 18-year-old delinquent died three days later, in the same Argerich hospital where Wolek, the US tourist, was being treated (he underwent several surgeries and was discharged from the hospital 57 days later).

Chocobar's actions were hailed as that of a hero by President Mauricio Macri and Security Secretary Patricia Bullrich, as well as by Wolek, who credited Chocobar with saving his life. This was highly criticized by several national and international left-wing organizations and a part of the public, who claimed that Chocobar acted with intent to kill.

== Trial ==
After the change of government in 2019, President Alberto Fernández abolished the Chocobar doctrine and Chocobar was ordered to face trial on aggravated murder, excessive use of force as a police officer and breach of duty. His trial heard closing statements on 26 May 2021. During the trial, Wolek, who could not visit Argentina again due to the COVID-19 pandemic, sent a message to the judges saying he was confident that they would "do the correct thing". He remotely (from the United States) thanked Chocobar for his actions and asked the judge to acquit him, whereas the victim's family asked for a life imprisonment sentence and the prosecution asked for 3 years of imprisonment. Chocobar was tried at the same time with the other delinquent (who was detained shortly after the attack), and whose name is not published due to him being a minor.

On 28 May 2021, Chocobar was sentenced to a suspended two-years' imprisonment and five years of suspension as a police officer. Chocobar did not serve time in prison due to the lightness of the sentence and announced that he will appeal to a higher court for acquittal.

The surviving criminal was sentenced to nine years in prison for attempted murder and attempted robbery and sent to a juvenile detention center.

== Aftermath ==
In April 2023, Chocobar was interviewed by MDZ Online. Chocobar said that he continues to work as a police officer given that his suspension of five years is not yet ratified by the Court of Cassation. Chocobar, who is studying to become a lawyer, said that if the Court of Cassation ratifies his suspension, he will appeal to the Supreme Court.

On 4 July 2023, the Supreme Court rejected an appeal by Chocobar's lawyers which demanded a retrial by jury and ratified the sentence in the first instance.

In May 2024, the Court of Cassation in Buenos Aires, annulled the conviction and sentence against Chocobar, ordering a new trial. The new proceedings against Chocobar were expected to begin in August 2025. However, the courts postponed the new trial to 2026 due to Chocobar's defense appealing for acquittal before the trial alleging a case of double jeopardy.
