= San Isidro de Iruya =

- Municipality and village
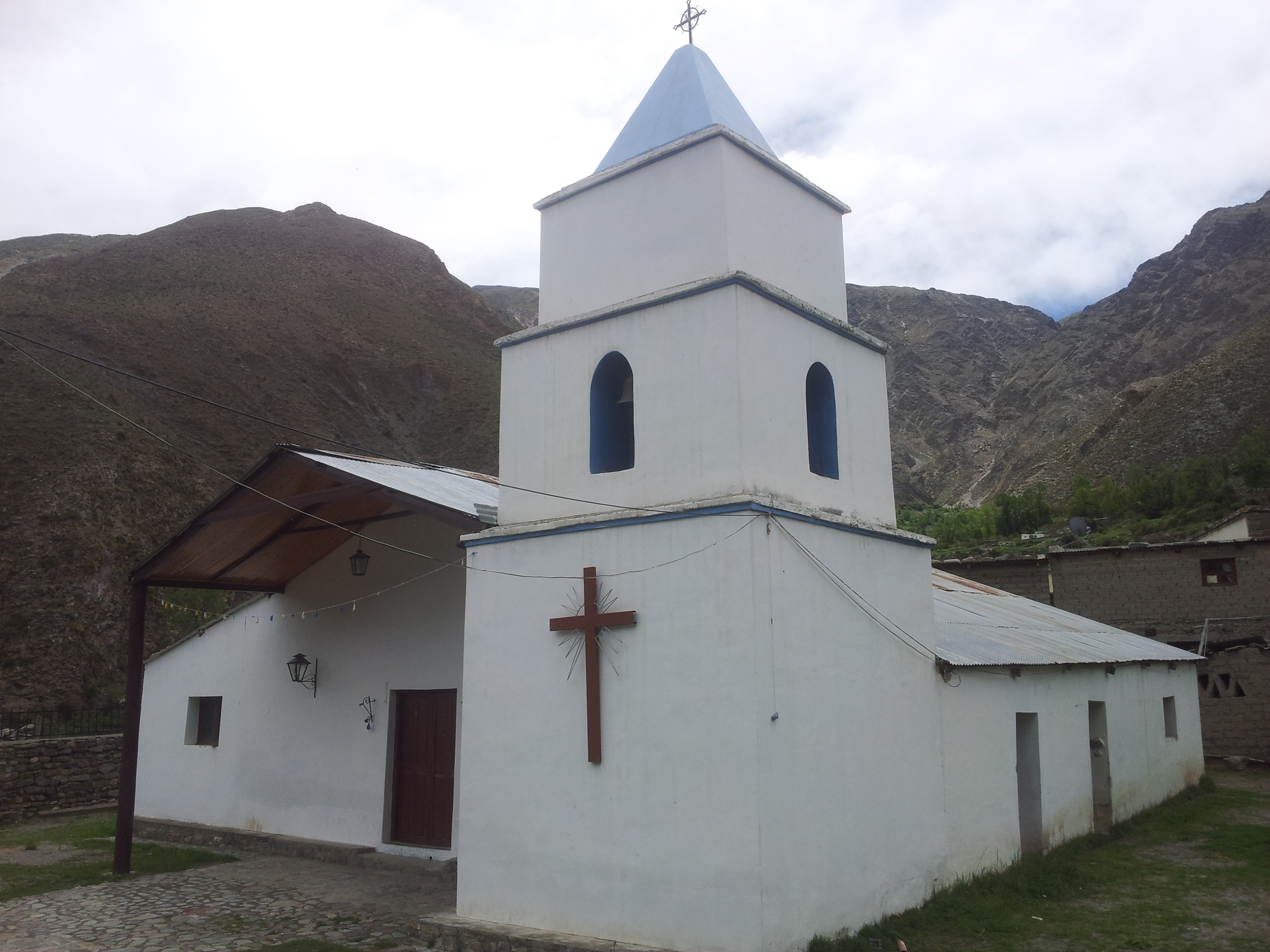
- The church of San Isidro
- Interactive map of San Isidro de Iruya
- Coordinates: 22°44′41″S 16°14′43″W
- Country: Argentina
- Province: Salta Province
- Department: Iruya
- Elevation: 2,900 m (9,500 ft)

Population (2001)
  - Total: 350
- Time zone: UTC−3 (ART)
- Postal code: 4633
- Area code: 03878

San Isidro de Iruya is a village and rural municipality in Salta Province in northwestern Argentina.
