= Chiyayoc =

Coordinates: 22°43′28″S 65°11′52″W

- Village
- Interactive map of Chiyayoc
- Country: Argentina
- Province: Salta Province
- Department: Iruya Department
- Time zone: UTC−3 (ART)

Chiyayoc is a small village in northwestern Argentina. It is part of the Iruya Department in the Salta Province. The village is located at an elevation of 3100 meters, 4 km east of the village of Salta and 9 km north of the village of Iruya.

Chiyayoc is part of the Finca el Potrero and has a school with about 30 children. The village lives from agriculture and tourism. It is easily accessible from Iruya in a six hours walk.
