= Cerrillos, Salta =

Cerrillos
- City
- Location of Cerrillos in Salta Province and Argentina Cerrillos (Argentina)
- Coordinates: 24°54′S 65°29′W
- Country: Argentina
- Province: Salta
- Department: Cerrillos

Government
  - Intendant: Enrique Borelli

Population
  - Total: 17,634
- Time zone: UTC−3 (ART)
- CPA base: A4403
- Dialing code: +54 387
- Climate: Cwb

Cerrillos is a city in the province of Salta, Argentina. It has about 18,000 inhabitants as per the 2001 census [INDEC], and it is the head town of the Cerrillos Department. It is located just 15 km south of the city of Salta, capital of the province.

== Geography ==
=== Climate ===
Climate data for Cerrillos, Salta (1969–2009)
Month	Jan	Feb	Mar	Apr	May	Jun	Jul	Aug	Sep	Oct	Nov	Dec	Year
Record high °C (°F)	37.6 (99.7)	33.9 (93.0)	33.9 (93.0)	33.0 (91.4)	33.7 (92.7)	33.5 (92.3)	36.2 (97.2)	36.2 (97.2)	37.4 (99.3)	37.9 (100.2)	39.5 (103.1)	38.0 (100.4)	39.5 (103.1)
Mean daily maximum °C (°F)	27.2 (81.0)	26.1 (79.0)	24.9 (76.8)	22.6 (72.7)	20.5 (68.9)	19.3 (66.7)	19.9 (67.8)	21.9 (71.4)	23.6 (74.5)	26.4 (79.5)	27.3 (81.1)	27.9 (82.2)	24.0 (75.2)
Daily mean °C (°F)	21.3 (70.3)	20.3 (68.5)	19.4 (66.9)	16.7 (62.1)	13.5 (56.3)	10.9 (51.6)	10.7 (51.3)	12.9 (55.2)	15.4 (59.7)	18.9 (66.0)	20.4 (68.7)	21.4 (70.5)	16.8 (62.2)
Mean daily minimum °C (°F)	16.7 (62.1)	15.9 (60.6)	15.4 (59.7)	12.2 (54.0)	8.2 (46.8)	4.8 (40.6)	3.8 (38.8)	5.4 (41.7)	8.0 (46.4)	12.0 (53.6)	14.3 (57.7)	16.0 (60.8)	11.1 (52.0)
Record low °C (°F)	8.9 (48.0)	5.2 (41.4)	5.1 (41.2)	0.4 (32.7)	−2.9 (26.8)	−5.3 (22.5)	−6.8 (19.8)	−5.1 (22.8)	−2.6 (27.3)	0.2 (32.4)	1.3 (34.3)	6.8 (44.2)	−6.8 (19.8)
Average precipitation mm (inches)	184.6 (7.27)	131.5 (5.18)	105.0 (4.13)	26.8 (1.06)	7.6 (0.30)	2.3 (0.09)	3.4 (0.13)	3.7 (0.15)	6.8 (0.27)	23.7 (0.93)	60.0 (2.36)	132.5 (5.22)	688.0 (27.09)
Average relative humidity (%)	78	80	82	81	79	75	68	61	57	60	66	72	72
Mean monthly sunshine hours	195.3	166.7	151.9	150.0	164.3	168.0	204.6	217.0	210.0	217.0	204.0	207.7	2,256.5
Percentage possible sunshine	46	46	40	43	48	53	61	62	58	55	51	49	51
Source: Instituto Nacional de Tecnología Agropecuaria
