= San José de Metán =

City in Salta Province, Argentina

- City
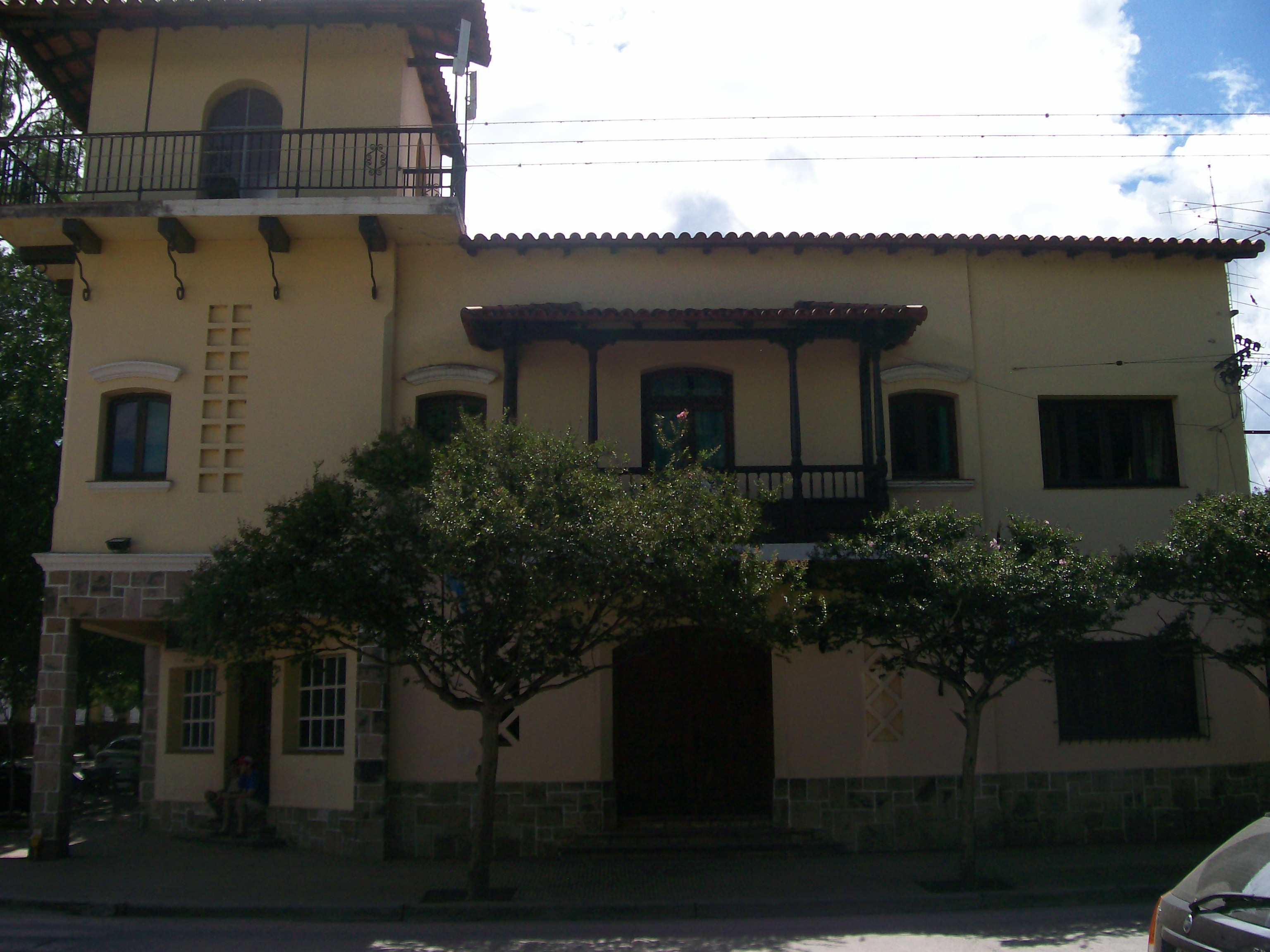
- City Hall

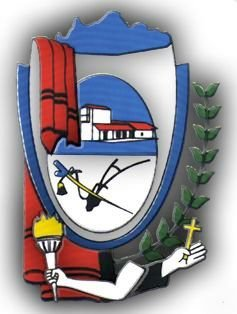
- Coat of arms

- Location of San José de Metán in Argentina
- Coordinates: 25°29′S 64°57′W
- Country: Argentina
- Province: Salta
- Department: Metán
- Elevation: 802 m (2,631 ft)

Population (2010 census)
  - Total: 28,295
- Time zone: UTC−3 (ART)
- CPA base: A4440
- Dialing code: +54 3876
- Climate: Cwa

San José de Metán (usually shortened to Metán) is a city in the south of the province of Salta, Argentina, 160 km from the provincial capital Salta, on National Routes 9 and 34. It has about 28,000 inhabitants as per the 2010 census [INDEC]. It is the head town of the Metán Department.

== Geography ==
=== Climate ===
Climate data for San José de Metán (1934–1990)
Month	Jan	Feb	Mar	Apr	May	Jun	Jul	Aug	Sep	Oct	Nov	Dec	Year
Daily mean °C (°F)	23.3 (73.9)	22.5 (72.5)	20.8 (69.4)	17.7 (63.9)	14.8 (58.6)	11.6 (52.9)	11.4 (52.5)	13.2 (55.8)	15.9 (60.6)	19.3 (66.7)	21.4 (70.5)	23.0 (73.4)	17.9 (64.2)
Average precipitation mm (inches)	183 (7.2)	169 (6.7)	169 (6.7)	66 (2.6)	20 (0.8)	12 (0.5)	6 (0.2)	5 (0.2)	7 (0.3)	39 (1.5)	78 (3.1)	149 (5.9)	903 (35.6)
Source: Instituto Nacional de Tecnología Agropecuaria
