= San Agustín, Salta =

Coordinates: 24°59′S 65°25′W

San Agustín
- Municipality and village
- Interactive map of San Agustín
- Country: Argentina
- Province: Salta Province
- Time zone: UTC−3 (ART)

San Agustín is a village and rural municipality in Salta Province which is located in northwestern Argentina.
