= La Merced, Salta =

La Merced
- Municipality and town
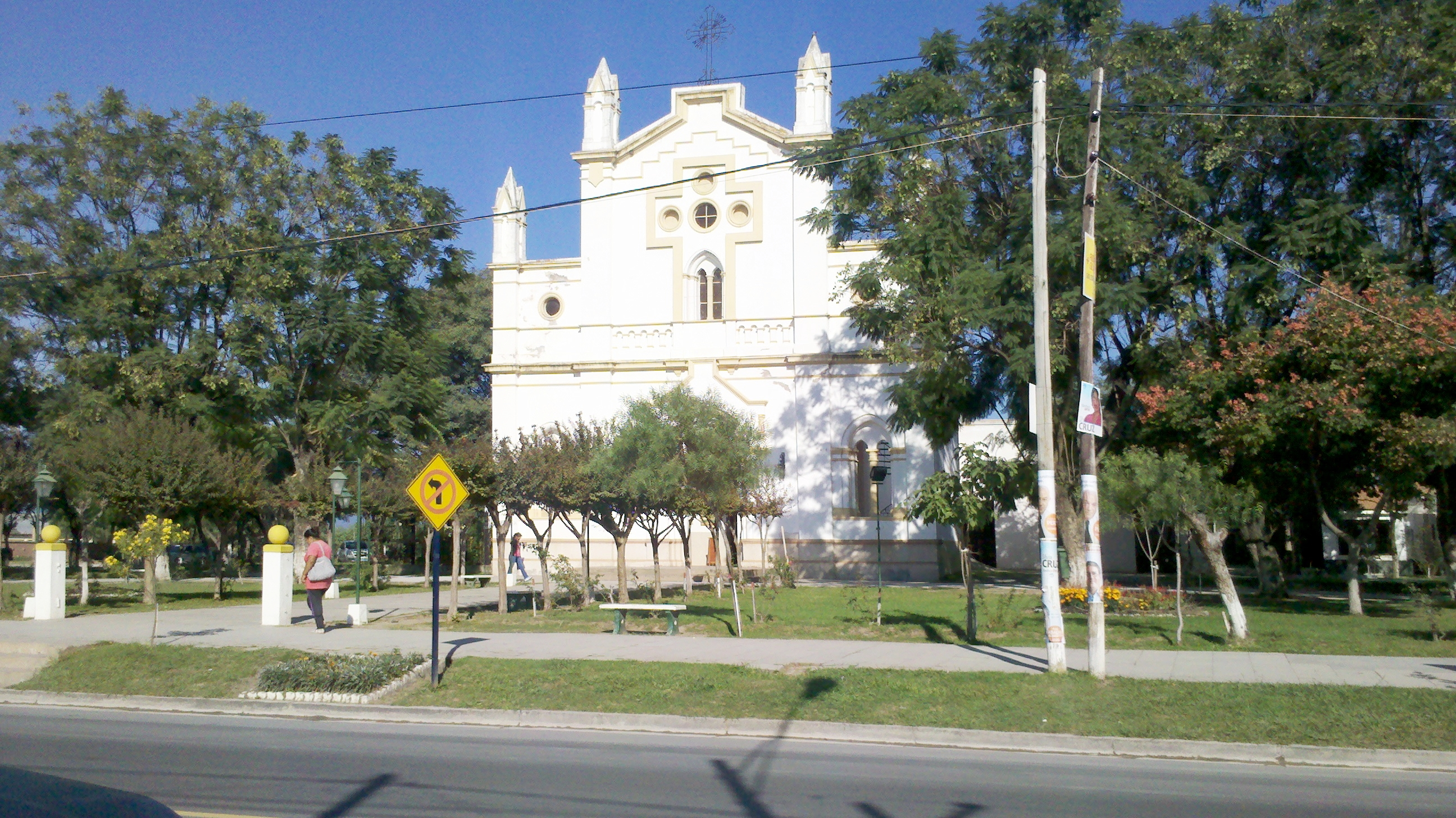

- Location within Salta Province Location within Argentina
- Country: Argentina
- Province: Salta Province

Government
  - Type: Municipality
  - Intendant: Javier Rafael Wayar

Population (2001)
  - Total: 5,084
- Demonym: Mercedeño
- Time zone: UTC−3 (ART)

La Merced is a town and municipality in Salta Province in northwestern Argentina.

== Notable citizens ==
- Luis Chocobar – born in La Merced, Chocobar moved to Buenos Aires and became a police officer. He was involved in a highly publicized killing and trial over the death of a young delinquent.
