= Rosario de la Frontera =

- City
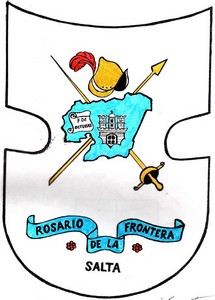
- Coat of arms

- Location of Rosario de la Frontera in Argentina
- Coordinates: 25°48′S 64°58′W
- Country: Argentina
- Province: Salta
- Department: Rosario de la Frontera

Area
  - Total: 5,402 km^{2} (2,086 sq mi)
- Elevation: 770 m (2,530 ft)

Population (2010 census)
  - Total: 260,174
  - Density: 48.16/km^{2} (124.7/sq mi)
- Time zone: UTC−3 (ART)
- CPA base: A4190
- Dialing code: +54 3876
- Climate: BSh

Rosario de la Frontera is a city in the center-south of the province of Salta, Argentina. It has 26,174 inhabitants as per the 2010 census [INDEC], and is the head town of the Rosario de la Frontera Department. It is located on National Route 9, by the Horcones River.

== Geography ==
=== Climate ===
Rosario de la Frontera has a dry-winter humid subtropical climate (Köppen Cwa), characterised by very warm and uncomfortably humid summers alongside pleasant to warm, dry winters with cold mornings and occasional frosts.

Climate data for Rosario de la Frontera
Month	Jan	Feb	Mar	Apr	May	Jun	Jul	Aug	Sep	Oct	Nov	Dec	Year
Record high °C (°F)	38.0 (100.4)	36.6 (97.9)	37.0 (98.6)	33.8 (92.8)	33.6 (92.5)	32.6 (90.7)	39.3 (102.7)	36.5 (97.7)	38.0 (100.4)	40.5 (104.9)	41.0 (105.8)	41.0 (105.8)	41.0 (105.8)
Mean daily maximum °C (°F)	29.1 (84.4)	28.1 (82.6)	26.2 (79.2)	23.3 (73.9)	21.3 (70.3)	18.9 (66.0)	19.7 (67.5)	22.1 (71.8)	24.0 (75.2)	27.9 (82.2)	28.5 (83.3)	29.5 (85.1)	24.9 (76.8)
Daily mean °C (°F)	23.1 (73.6)	22.1 (71.8)	20.7 (69.3)	17.7 (63.9)	14.8 (58.6)	11.8 (53.2)	11.5 (52.7)	13.8 (56.8)	16.2 (61.2)	20.3 (68.5)	21.7 (71.1)	23.0 (73.4)	18.1 (64.6)
Mean daily minimum °C (°F)	18.1 (64.6)	17.3 (63.1)	16.5 (61.7)	13.2 (55.8)	9.2 (48.6)	5.4 (41.7)	4.4 (39.9)	5.7 (42.3)	8.3 (46.9)	12.7 (54.9)	15.4 (59.7)	17.3 (63.1)	11.9 (53.4)
Record low °C (°F)	9.9 (49.8)	5.9 (42.6)	7.5 (45.5)	1.6 (34.9)	−2.9 (26.8)	−5.6 (21.9)	−7.1 (19.2)	−5.8 (21.6)	−2.1 (28.2)	2.4 (36.3)	4.4 (39.9)	8.6 (47.5)	−7.1 (19.2)
Average rainfall mm (inches)	205.0 (8.07)	180.2 (7.09)	161.9 (6.37)	65.8 (2.59)	17.1 (0.67)	5.7 (0.22)	4.7 (0.19)	5.8 (0.23)	7.8 (0.31)	26.8 (1.06)	76.0 (2.99)	161.9 (6.37)	926.9 (36.49)
Average relative humidity (%)	77	80	83	82	79	75	69	61	58	59	66	72	71
Mean monthly sunshine hours	204.6	183.6	155.0	138.0	155.0	153.0	186.0	198.4	195.0	210.8	195.0	210.8	2,185.2
Mean daily sunshine hours	6.5	6.5	5.0	4.6	5.0	5.1	6.0	6.4	6.5	6.8	6.5	6.8	6.0
Source: Instituto Nacional de Tecnología Agropecuaria
