= De Güemes =

De Güemes is a surname, and may refer to:

- Juan Francisco de Güemes y Horcasitas, 1st Count of Revillagigedo (1681–1766), Spanish general, governor of Havana, captain general of Cuba, and viceroy of New Spain
- Juan Vicente de Güemes Padilla Horcasitas y Aguayo, 2nd Count of Revillagigedo (1740–1799), Spanish military officer and viceroy of New Spain
- Martín Miguel de Güemes (1785–1821), military leader
