= Presa El Tunal =

Coordinates: 25°15′S 64°25′W

- Municipality and village
- Interactive map of Presa El Tunal
- Country: Argentina
- Province: Salta Province
- Time zone: UTC−3 (ART)

Presa El Tunal is a village and rural municipality in Salta Province in northwestern Argentina.
