= San José de Orquera =

Coordinates: 25°17′S 64°06′W

- Municipality and village
- Interactive map of San José de Orquera
- Country: Argentina
- Province: Salta Province

San José de Orquera is a village and rural municipality in Salta Province in northwestern Argentina.
