= Capital Department, Salta =

Capital
- Department
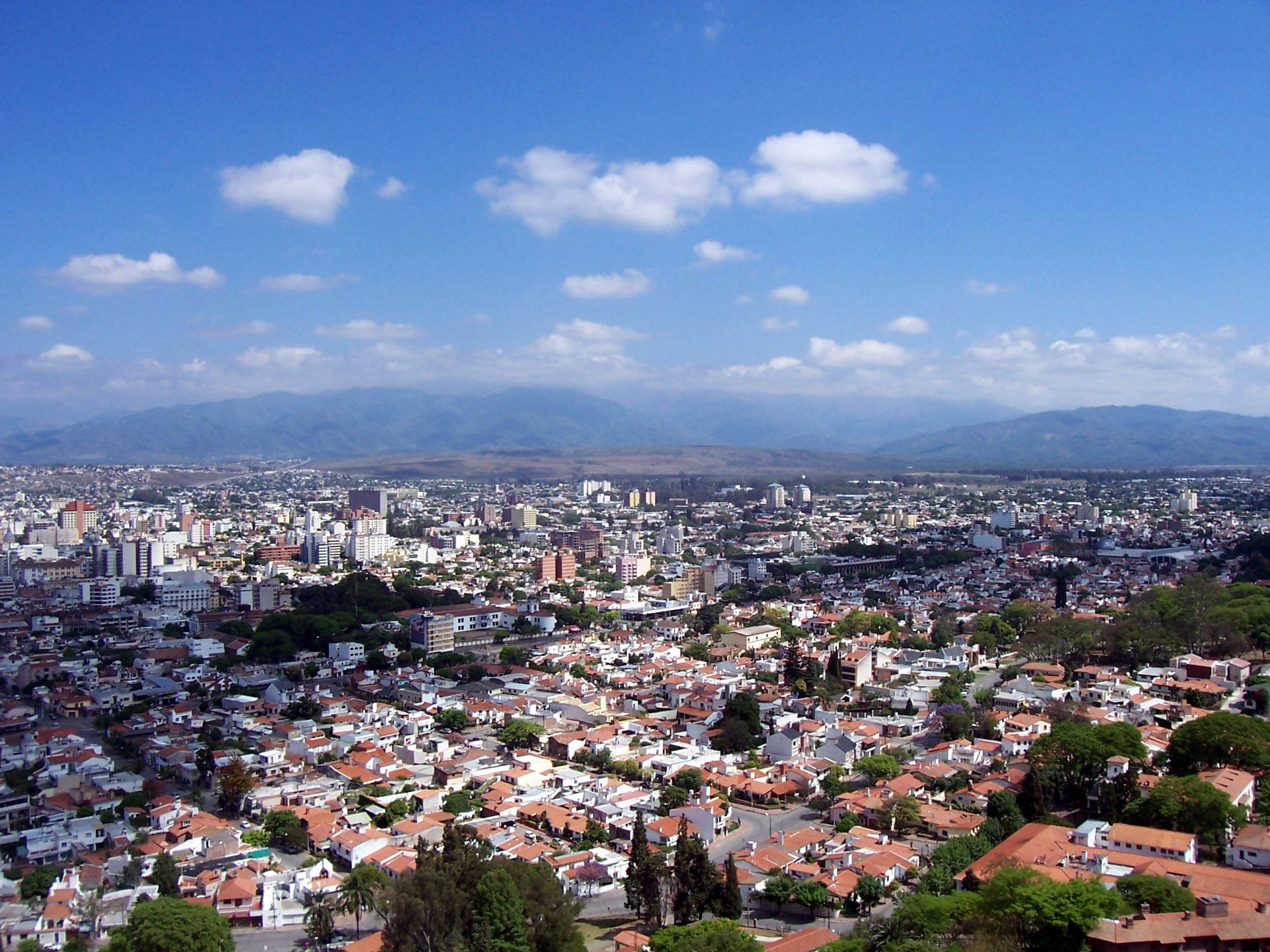
- View of Salta, department's Capital

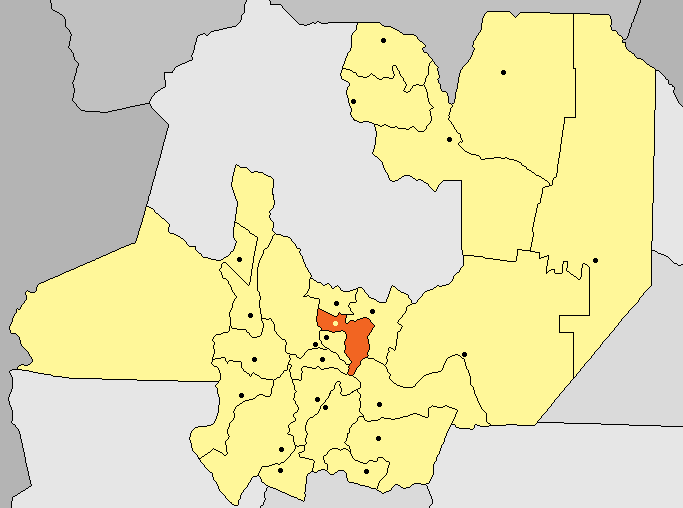
- Coordinates: 24°47′21″S 65°24′38″W
- Country: Argentina
- Province: Salta
- Capital: Salta

Area
  - Total: 1,722 km^{2} (665 sq mi)

Population (2010)
  - Total: 535,303
  - Density: 310.9/km^{2} (805.1/sq mi)

Capital is a department located in Salta Province, Argentina. It is the department of the provincial capital, the city of Salta, and the most populated one.

== Geography ==
Overview

The department is located in the middle of the province. It borders with the departments of La Caldera, General Güemes, Metán, La Viña, Chicoana, Cerrillos and Rosario de Lerma.

Towns and municipalities

- Salta (535,060 inh.)
- Villa San Lorenzo (4,915 inh.)

== See also ==
- Tren a las Nubes
- Salta–Antofagasta railway
- Martín Miguel de Güemes International Airport
