= Lumbreras, Salta =

Coordinates: 25°12′S 64°55′W

Lumbreras
- Municipality and village
- Interactive map of Lumbreras
- Country: Argentina
- Province: Salta Province
- Time zone: UTC−3 (ART)

Lumbreras is a village and rural municipality in Salta Province in northwestern Argentina.
