= Río Piedras, Salta =

Coordinates: 25°18′S 64°54′W

Río Piedras
- Municipality and village
- Interactive map of Río Piedras
- Country: Argentina
- Province: Salta Province
- Time zone: UTC−3 (ART)

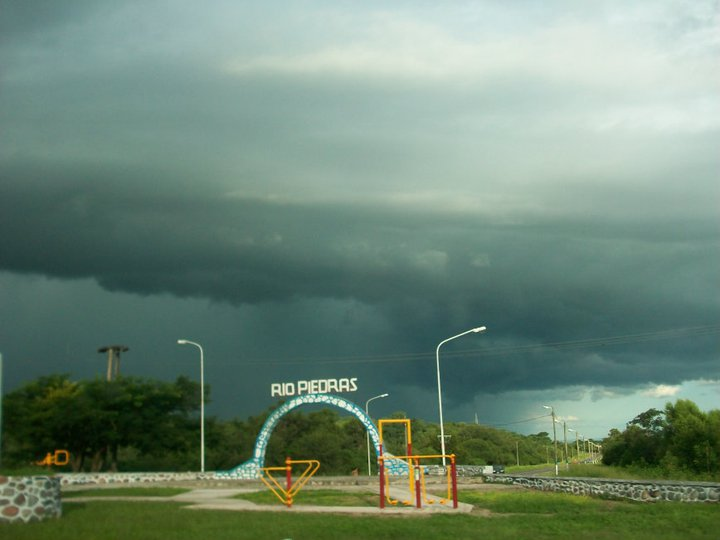
Entrance to Río Piedras, Argentina

Río Piedras is a village and rural municipality in Salta Province in northwestern Argentina.
