= La Viña Department =

La Viña
- Department
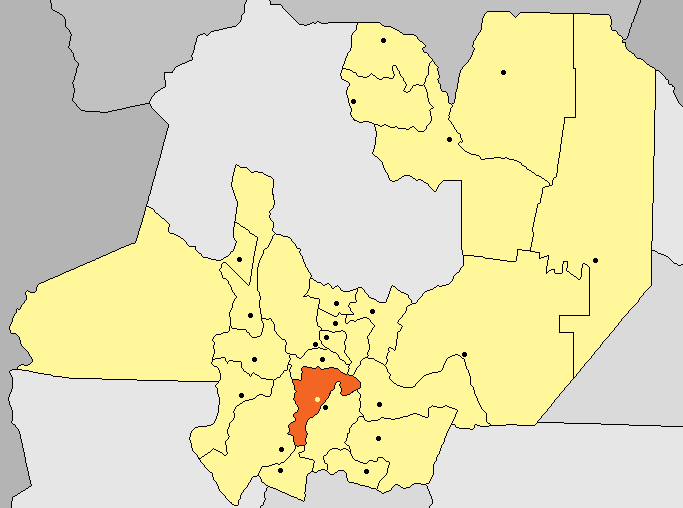
- Coordinates: 25°28′5″S 65°33′55″W
- Country: Argentina
- Province: Salta

Area
  - Total: 2,152 km^{2} (831 sq mi)

Population (2010)
  - Total: 7,152
  - Density: 3.323/km^{2} (8.608/sq mi)

La Viña is a department located in Salta Province, in northwestern Argentina.

With an area of 2,152 km^{2} (831 sq mi) it is one of the smallest departments of the province. It borders to the north with the departments of Cerrillos, and Rosario de Lerma, to the east with Capital Department, to the south with La Viña Department and to the west with the departments of Cachi and San Carlos.

== Towns and municipalities ==
- Coronel Moldes
- La Viña
- Ampascachi
- Talapampa
- Cabra Corral
- El Carmen
- Osma
- Veinte de Febrero
- Saladillo

=== Hydrography ===
The most important river in the department is the Guachipas also known in ots beginning as the Las Conchas. It flows to Embalse Cabra Corral.
