= Orán Department =

Orán Departamento Orán
- Department
- Interactive map of Orán
- Country: Argentina
- Seat: San Ramón de la Nueva Orán

For the historical département in Algeria, see Oran (department).

Orán is a department of the province of Salta (Argentina). It has about 124,000 residents.

== Seismicity ==
The seismicity of the Salta area is frequent and of low intensity, with medium to severe earthquakes every 40 years.
