= Cerrillos Department =

Cerrillos
- Department
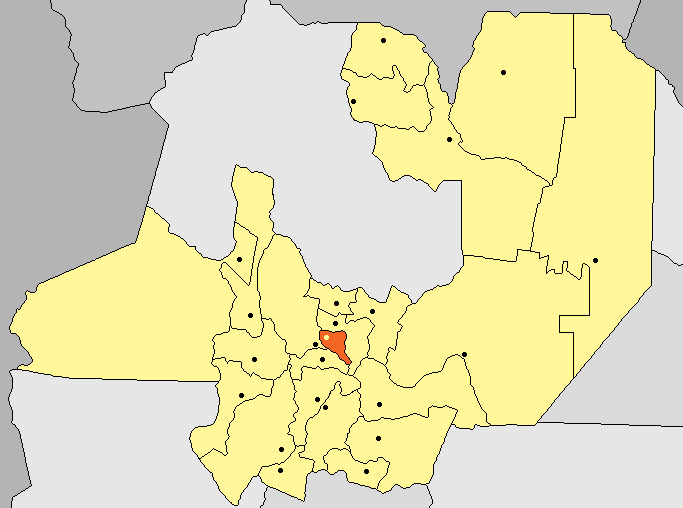
- Coordinates: 24°53′45″S 65°29′14″W
- Country: Argentina
- Province: Salta
- Capital: Cerrillos

Area
  - Total: 640 km^{2} (250 sq mi)

Population (2010)
  - Total: 35,579
  - Density: 56/km^{2} (140/sq mi)

Cerrillos is a department of Salta Province, Argentina, located near Salta city. Its capital is the town of Cerrillos.

== Geography ==
Localities and places:

- Cerrillos
- La Merced
- San Agustín
- Sumalao
- Villa Los Álamos

== See also ==
- Tren a las Nubes
- Salta–Antofagasta railway
