= Isla de Cañas, Argentina =

Isla de Cañas
- Municipality and village
- Location within Salta Province Location within Argentina
- Country: Argentina
- Province: Salta Province
- Time zone: UTC−3 (ART)

Isla de Cañas is a village and rural municipality in Salta Province in northwestern Argentina. It is located at 610 meters above sea level, on the eastern slopes of the Sierra de Santa Victoria, 307 km from the capital of Salta. The municipality of Isla de Cañas is only accessible from Oran, there are no bus services, only private shuttles that travel from Oran to Isla de Cañas three times a week; these shuttles are only available before 5pm on Mondays, Wednesdays and Fridays.

From Isla de Cañas, one can travel to Iruya, though this is only possible during winter (June through mid-November). Travel to Iruya and back to Isla de Cañas is restricted to tractors or 4x4 trucks.

== Population ==
In the 2001 census the population was 1,150, showing a 58.2% increase from the recorded population of 727 in the 1991 census.

== Infrastructure ==
The town has electricity, Internet, satellite television and, since December 2012, mobile telephone service. There is only one fixed telephone in town that is semi-public, but its operation is not entirely optimal as it is out of service for long periods. Isla de Cañas also has a church, a health center, a pharmacy and an airstrip, which is used sporadically for medical flights.

Important to the infrastructure of the municipality is the Iruya River, which crosses its boarder flowing west to east.

There is a primary school, a secondary school, and as of August 2012 this includes bilingual intercultural teaching staff.

== Geography ==
The climate in the area is tropical and has a higher annual rainfall than its neighbor Iruya. The area is over 600 meters above sea level and the municipality covers 1202 km^{2}.

=== Flora ===
The flora in Isla de Cañas consists of the following: cebil, red cebil, cedar, alder, pine from the hill, walnut, peteribí (white and red type), kolla cedar, pacará, pink lapacho, oak and blackberry.
