= Rosario de la Frontera Department =

Rosario de la Frontera Departamento Rosario de la Frontera
- Department
- Interactive map of Rosario de la Frontera
- Country: Argentina
- Seat: Rosario de la Frontera

Rosario de la Frontera is a department of the province of Salta (Argentina).
