= Santa Victoria Department =

Santa Victoria Departamento Santa Victoria
- Department
- Interactive map of Santa Victoria
- Country: Argentina
- Seat: Santa Victoria Oeste

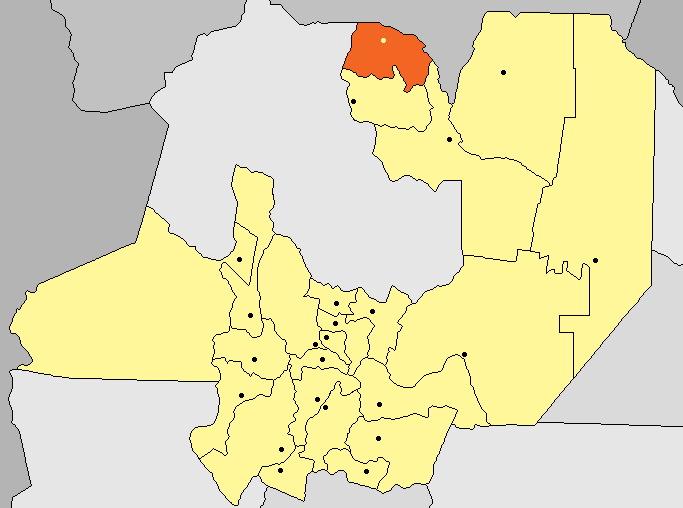
Map of the Santa Victoria Department

Santa Victoria is a department of the province of Salta (Argentina).
