= Metán Viejo =

Coordinates: 25°32′S 64°58′W

- Municipality and village
- Interactive map of Metán Viejo
- Country: Argentina
- Province: Salta Province
- Time zone: UTC−3 (ART)

Metán Viejo is a village and rural municipality in Salta Province in northwestern Argentina.
