= General Güemes, Salta =

General Güemes
- City
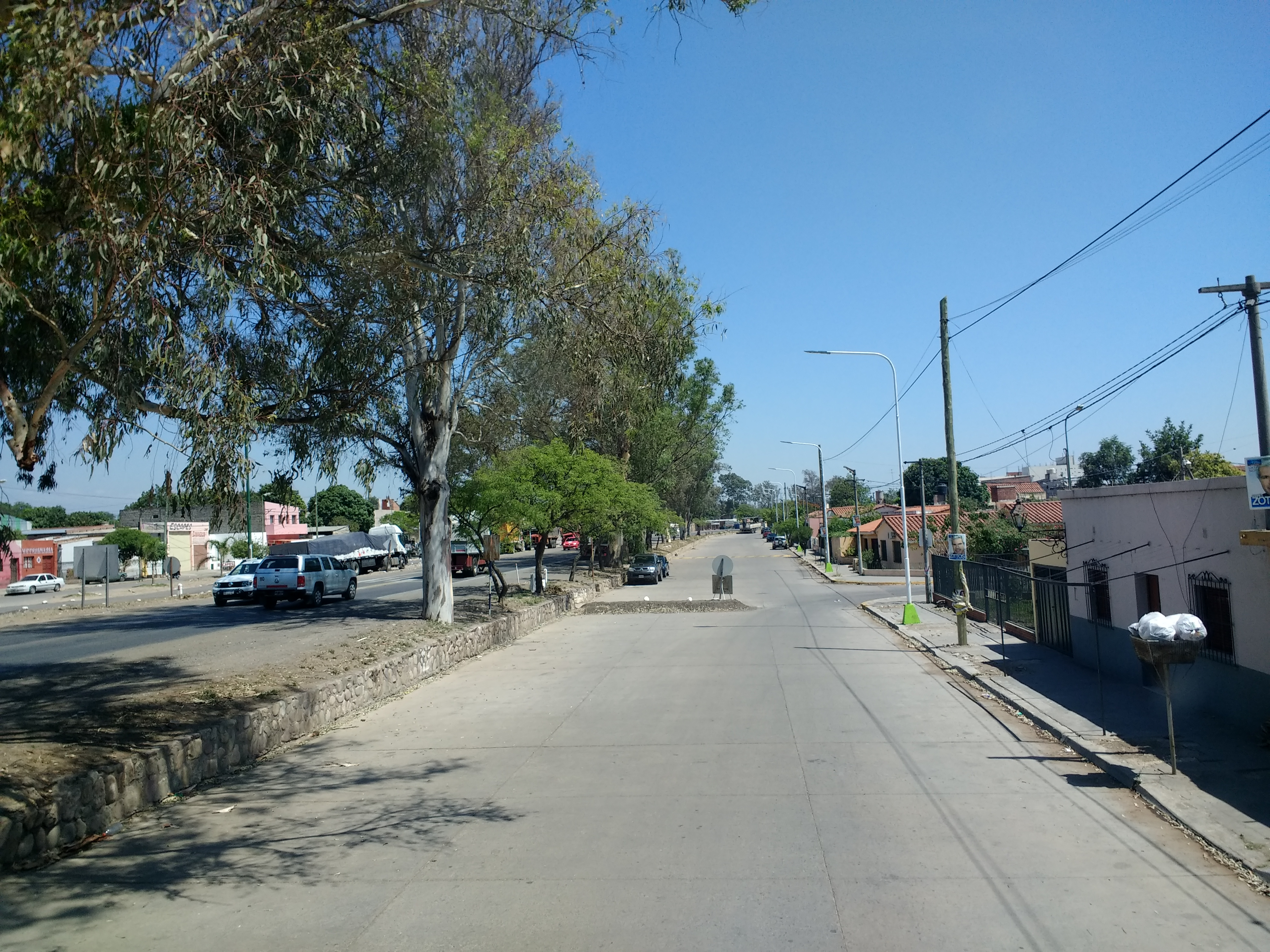

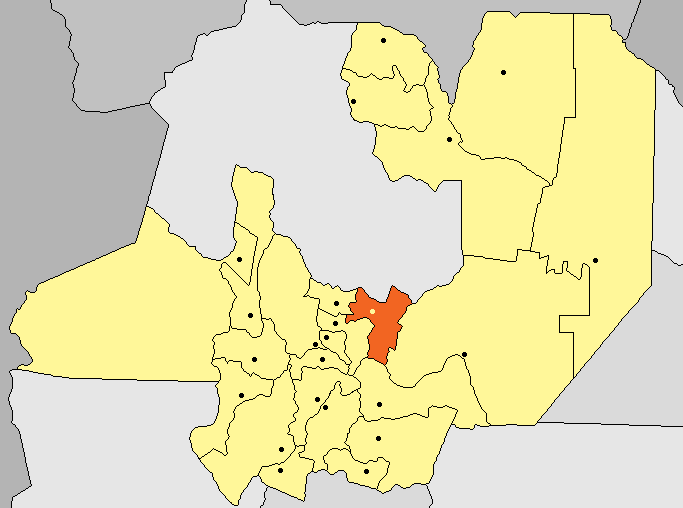
- Güemes (yellow dot) within the homonymous department (red) and Salta Province

- Location of General Güemes in Argentina
- Coordinates: 24°40′S 65°3′W
- Country: Argentina
- Province: Salta
- Department: General Güemes

Government
  - Intendant: Carlos Rosso
- Elevation: 295 m (968 ft)

Population (2010 census)
  - Total: 47,348
- Time zone: UTC−3 (ART)
- CPA base: A4430
- Dialing code: +54 387
- Climate: BSh

General Güemes (Spanish pronunciation: [xeneˌɾal ˈɡwemes]), sometimes shortened to Güemes, is a town in the center of the province of Salta, Argentina. It has 47,348 inhabitants as per the 2010 census [INDEC], and is the head town of the General Güemes Department.

== Overview ==
It lies approximately 45 km east-northeast from the provincial capital Salta, on National Route 9. Its name is a homage to caudillo Martín Miguel de Güemes (1785–1821), hero of the Argentine War of Independence.

In 2008, the city gained media attention after sightings of a "mysterious gnome" were reported.

== Transport ==
General Güemes is the terminus station of narrow gauge train that connects it to Salta.
