= La Caldera Department =

La Caldera
- Department
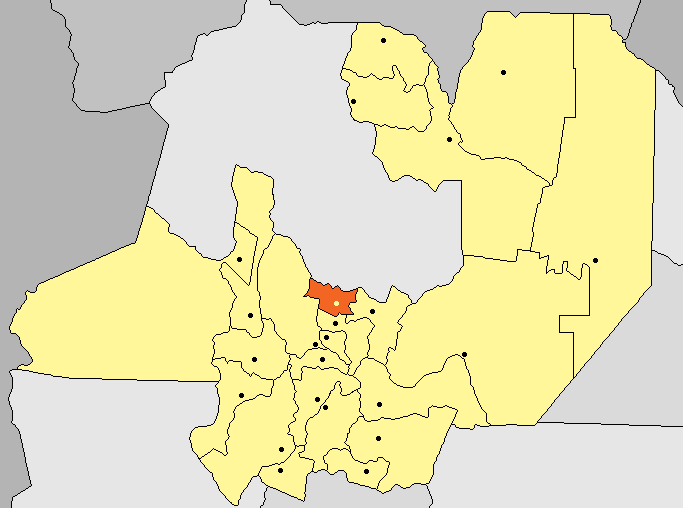
- Coordinates: 24°36′4″S 65°22′43″W
- Country: Argentina
- Province: Salta

Area
  - Total: 867 km^{2} (335 sq mi)

Population (2010)
  - Total: 5,711
  - Density: 6.59/km^{2} (17.1/sq mi)

La Caldera is a department located in Salta Province, Argentina.

== Towns and municipalities ==
- La Caldera
- Vaqueros
- La Calderilla
- Los Yacones
- Potrero de Castilla
