= Iruya Department =

Coordinates: 22°47′27″S 65°13′07″W

Iruya
- Department
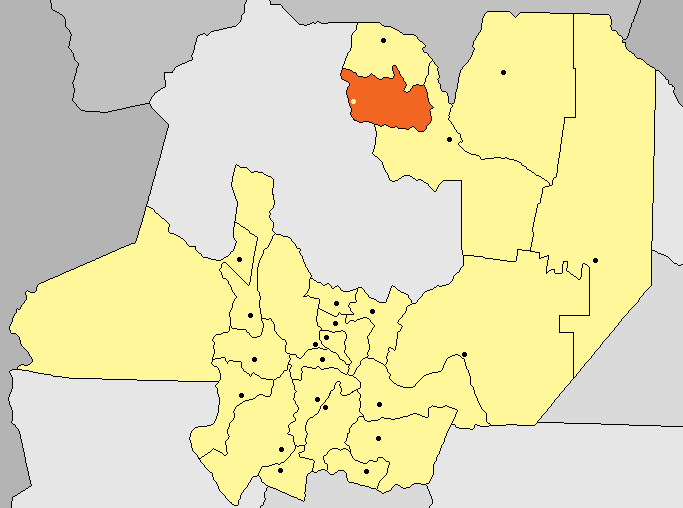
- Country: Argentina
- Province: Salta
- Capital: Iruya

Area
  - Total: 3,515 km^{2} (1,357 sq mi)

Population (2001 (INDEC))
  - Total: 6,370
  - Density: 1.81/km^{2} (4.69/sq mi)
- Important cities: Iruya

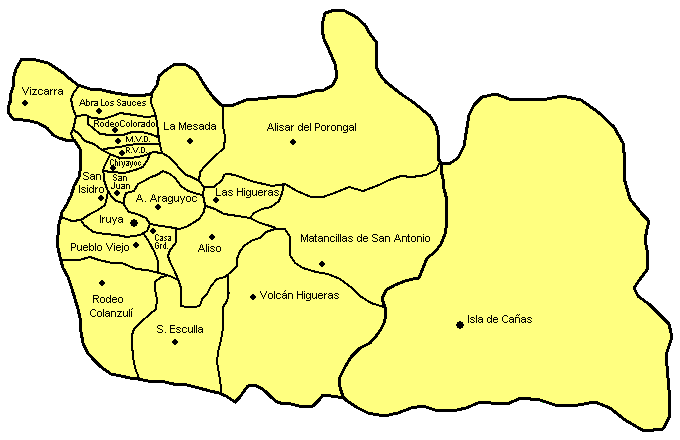
Subdivisions of Iruya Department

Iruya is a department is located in the north of Salta Province in northwest Argentina in the high altitude basin of the Bermejo River. It is one of 23 administrative units in the province.

Adjacent departments are Santa Victoria Department in the north of Iruya, Orán Department in the east and south and Humahuaca Department of the Jujuy Province in the west.

The capital of the Iruya Department is the homonymous village of Iruya.

== Municipalities ==
The Iruya Department is divided into the two municipalities (Spanish municipios) of Isla de Cañas and Iruya.

== Population ==
In the Iruya Department there are more than 70 communities of Indians, belonging to the Kolla tribe.

According to the last census, the Iruya Department has 6370 inhabitants (INDEC, 2001). The INDEC estimates that in 2005 the population has risen to 7965 inhabitants.

== Climate ==
The climate ranges from cool mountain climate in the west to tropical climate in the east.
