= General Güemes Department, Salta =

General Güemes
- Department
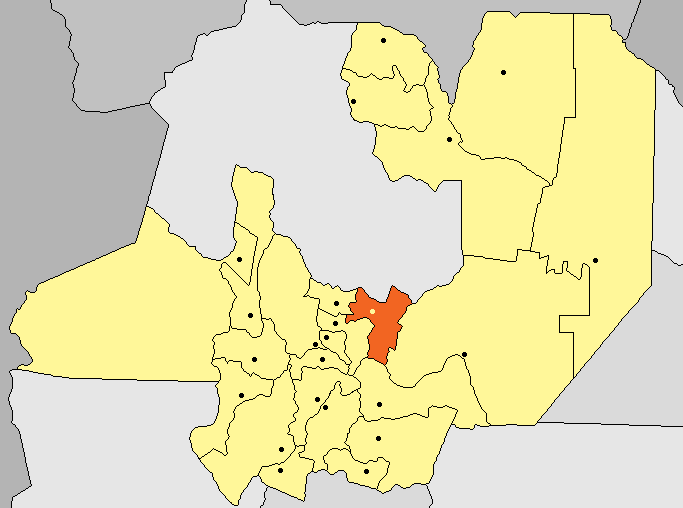
- Coordinates: 24°10′15″S 65°2′49″W
- Country: Argentina
- Province: Salta

Area
  - Total: 2,365 km^{2} (913 sq mi)

Population (2010)
  - Total: 42,255
  - Density: 17.87/km^{2} (46.27/sq mi)

General Güemes is a department located in Salta Province, Argentina.

== Towns and municipalities ==
- General Güemes
- Campo Santo
- El Bordo
- Cobos
- Cabeza de Buey
- Palomitas
- Betania
- Cruz Quemada
- El Salto
- Km 1094
- Las Mesitas
- Virgilio Tedin
- Los Sauces
