= Geography of Argentina =

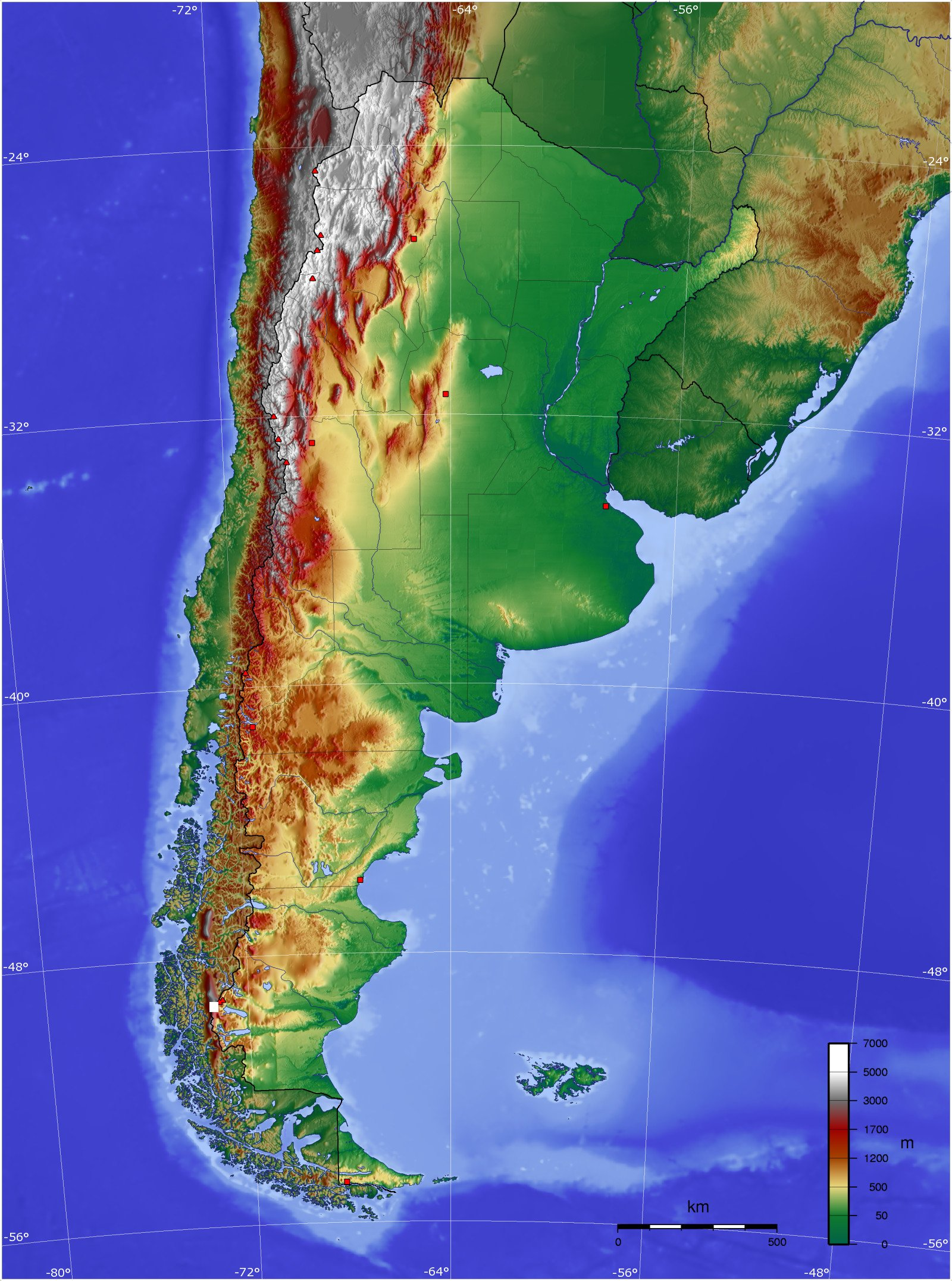
- Continent: South America
- Region: Southern Hemisphere
- Coordinates: 34°00′S 64°00′W
- Area: Ranked 8th
  - Total: 2,780,400 km^{2} (1,073,500 sq mi)
  - Land: 98.43%
  - Water: 1.56%
- Coastline: 4,989 km (3,100 mi)
- Borders: Chile 6,691 km (4,157 mi); Paraguay 2,531 km (1,572 mi); Brazil 1,263 km (784 mi); Bolivia 942 km (585 mi); Uruguay 541 km (336 mi)
- Highest point: Cerro Aconcagua, 6,960 m
- Lowest point: Laguna del Carbón, -105 m
- Longest river: Paraná River, 4,700 km
- Largest lake: Lake Buenos Aires 1,850 km²
- Exclusive economic zone: 1,159,063 km^{2} (447,517 mi^{2})

The geography of Argentina is heavily diverse, consisting of the Andes Mountains, pampas, and various rivers and lakes. Bordered by the Andes in the west and the South Atlantic Ocean to the east, its neighboring countries are Chile to the west, Bolivia and Paraguay to the north, and Brazil and Uruguay to the northeast.

In terms of area, Argentina is the second largest country in South America after Brazil, and is the eighth largest country in the world. Its total area is 2,780,400 km^{2} (1,073,500 mi^{2}). Argentina claims a section of Antarctica (Argentine Antarctica) that is subject to the Antarctic Treaty. Argentina also asserts claims to several British South Atlantic islands.

With a population of 46.6 million, Argentina ranks as the world's 31st most populous country as of 2010.

== General characteristics ==
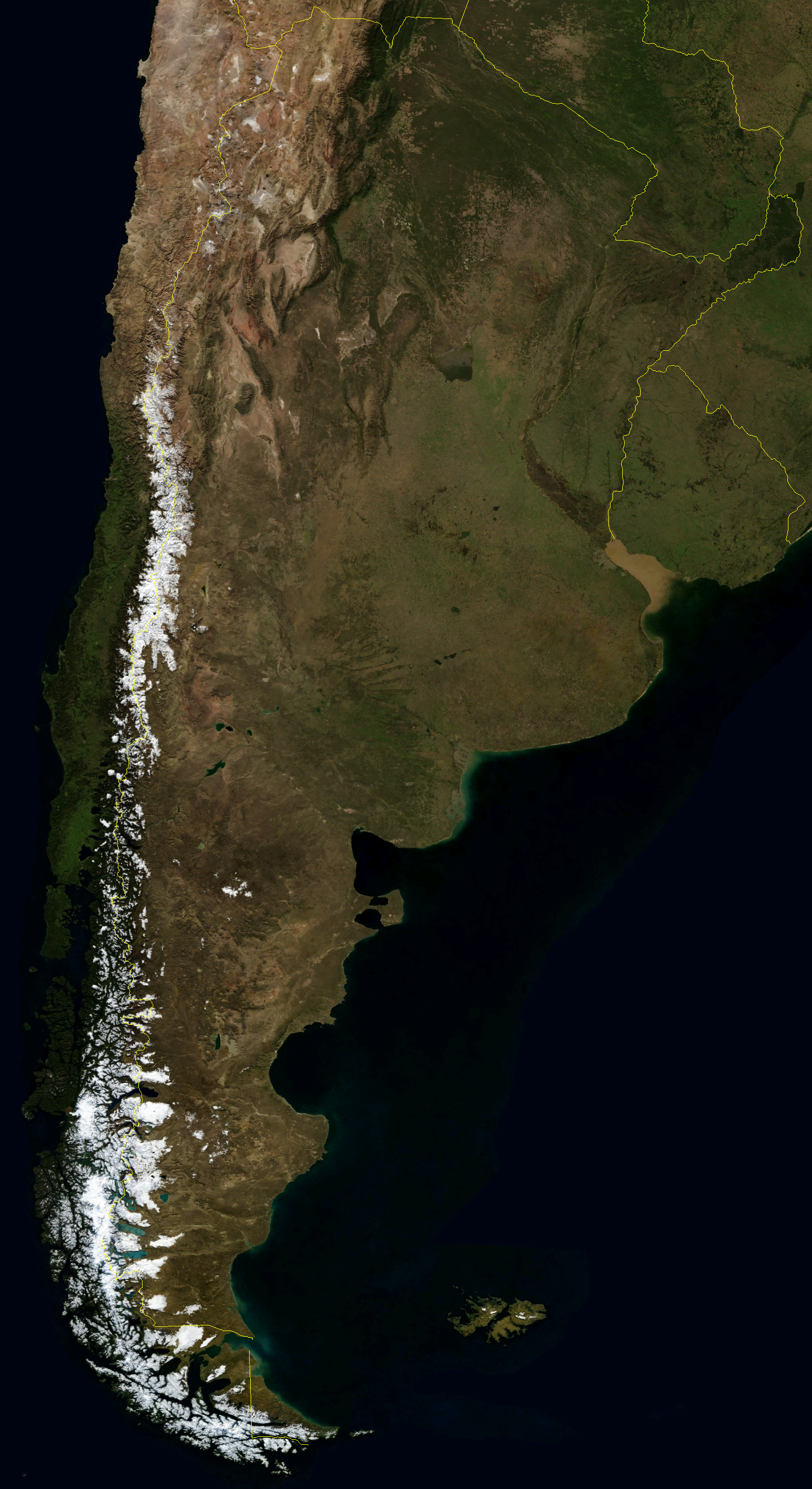
Satellite map of Argentina taken by NASA World Wind.

Argentina is located in the southern part of South America, being the biggest country in the Southern Cone. It limits with Chile to the west and south, with the Argentina–Chile border being its largest one. Bolivia and Paraguay limit Argentina in the north, the Argentina–Paraguay border is the second largest one. The northern half of Argentina limits with Brazil and Uruguay to the east, and the southern half with the Atlantic Ocean. The Falkland Islands, a British Overseas Territory, are located to the east of southern Argentina, across the ocean. Argentina is located at a strategic point over the Strait of Magellan, the link between the Atlantic and Pacific oceans.

Argentina has a land area of 2,780,400 km². It is the 8th largest country in the world, between India and Kazakhstan. It is the second largest country in South America, after Brazil, and the fourth largest in the Americas after Brazil, Canada, and the United States. The surface is almost eight times that of Germany, and four times that of Texas, and three-tenths the size of the United States. The Argentine Sea, the maritime claims of Argentina, include an exclusive economic zone of 200 nm.

The terrain is composed of plains to the East, with the Andes mountain range at the western border. Climate is mostly temperate, with an arid area in southeast Patagonia and a subantarctic climate in the southwest. The Iguazu Falls, one of the New 7 Wonders of Nature, is the largest waterfall system in the world. It is located at the frontier with Brazil, with both countries having part of it.

As for the national extreme points, the northernmost point is the confluence of the Grande de San Juan river and the Mojinete river, at the Jujuy Province. The southernmost point is the Cape San Pío at the Tierra del Fuego Province, at the entry point of the Beagle Channel. The westernmost point is located at the Los Glaciares National Park, at the Santa Cruz Province. The easternmost point is the "Hito V" (CONALI), located at Bernardo de Irigoyen, Misiones. The highest point of Argentina is the Aconcagua mountain at the Mendoza Province, with 6962 m., which is also the highest point of South America. The lowest point is Laguna del Carbón, at the Santa Cruz Province.

In Argentina forest cover is around 10% of the total land area, equivalent to 28,573,000 hectares (ha) of forest in 2020, down from 35,204,000 hectares (ha) in 1990. In 2020, naturally regenerating forest covered 27,137,000 hectares (ha) and planted forest covered 1,436,000 hectares (ha). Of the naturally regenerating forest 0% was reported to be primary forest (consisting of native tree species with no clearly visible indications of human activity) and around 7% of the forest area was found within protected areas. For the year 2015, 0% of the forest area was reported to be under public ownership, 4% private ownership and 96% with ownership listed as other or unknown.

== Regions ==
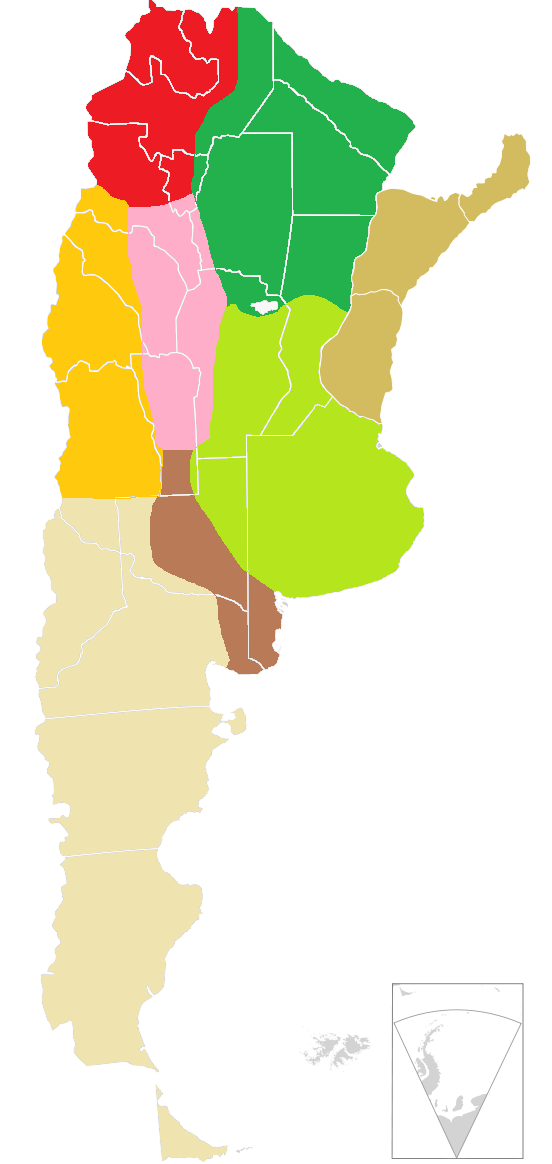
Regions of Argentina: Northwest Chaco Region Mesopotamia Cuyo Sierras pampeanas Pampas Dry Pampas Patagonia Antarctica islands.

The Cuyo region is located in the middle-west of the country. It comprises the west of Catamarca and La Rioja, most of San Juan, and the center and north of Mendoza. It limits to the Argentine Northwest to the north, Chile to the west, the Pampas to the east, and the Patagonia to the south. Most of the region is part of the Andes mountain range. It is divided in the occidental range, whose mountains are largely uniform, and the oriental range, with more varied geographic features. The snow line is located at 5000 m. of altitude. There is a corridor between mountains with rivers and lakes, irrigated by the snow that melts during summer. Most of those rivers become tributaries of the Desaguadero River. The climate is arid, with few rains and even few clouds. There are few native trees, and most vegetation are bushes adapted to the climate. The fauna includes camelids such as guanacos and vicuñas, and vultures like the Andean condor.

The Gran Chaco region is located in the north of the country. It comprises the provinces of Formosa, Chaco, Santiago del Estero and north of Santa Fe. It limits to Bolivia and Paraguay to the north, the Argentine Norwest to the west, the Pampas to the south, and Paraguay and the Mesopotamia to the east. The land is completely flat, which leads to an abundance of swamps and vernal pools. The most important rivers are the Paraguay and Parana, and their tributaries Pilcomayo and Bermejo. The climate is subtropical, with a dry season to the west and without it to the east. There are xerophilous forests.

The Mesopotamia region is located in the east of the country, between the Parana and Uruguay rivers. It comprises the provinces of Misiones, Corrientes, and Entre Ríos. It limits to Paraguay and Brazil to the north, Gran Chaco and pampas to the west, Brazil and Uruguay to the east, and the pampas to the south. Most of it is a plain, and the rivers end at the Río de la Plata, making the Río de la Plata Basin.

The Argentine Northwest region comprises the provinces of Jujuy, Salta, Tucumán, Catamarca, and La Rioja. It limits to Bolivia to the north, Chile to the west, Cuyo to the south and the Gran Chaco to the east. The region is divided into three subregions, the Puna to the west, valleys in the middle, and hills to the east. The Puna is a high treeless plateau, which continues to the west into the Atacama Desert in Chile. It has characteristic salt pans. There is very little water in that area, mostly in temporary streams. The hills and valleys are wetter, with the rain that comes from the east, and includes rivers such as the Salado and Bermejo. Climate is arid in the Puna and subtropical in the east.

Argentina's provinces are divided in seven zones regarding climate and terrain. From North to South, West to East:

- Argentine Northwest: Jujuy, Salta, Tucumán, Catamarca, La Rioja
- Gran Chaco: Formosa, Chaco, Santiago del Estero
- Mesopotamia: Misiones, Corrientes, Entre Ríos
- Cuyo: San Juan, Mendoza, San Luis
- The Pampas: Santa Fe, La Pampa, Buenos Aires, Córdoba
- Patagonia: Rio Negro, Neuquén, Chubut, Santa Cruz, Tierra del Fuego

=== Land use ===
- Arable land: 13.9%
- Permanent crops: 0.4%
- Permanent pastures: 39.6%
- Forest: 10.7%
- Other: 35.4% (2020)
- Irrigated land: 23,600 km^{2} (2020)
- Total renewable water resources: 814 km^{3}/yr

== Mountains and hills ==
The Andes mountain range is the longest mountain range in the world, running along Argentina's border with Chile. The highest peak in the Andes is Aconcagua, almost 7000 meters (almost 23000 feet) above sea level. Argentina is also famous for its glaciers. Cerro Cathedral is a famous ski resort in the Patagonian mountains at Nahuel Huapí National Park. The Cordillera de la Ramada is a range in San Juan, Argentina. Monte Fitz Roy is another famous mountain.

== Water resources ==
In Argentina, the fluvial net is integrated by many systems of different economic relevance, which could be measured by their amount of flow and navigability. Water flow relevance is based on its potential to be used for irrigation and as a source of energy. Depending on where the water streams drain, rivers and creeks could be classified into three different kinds of watersheds:

- Open or exorheic watersheds: they have exterior drainage (into the sea) - Parana River, Uruguay River, Negro River
- Closed or endorheic watersheds: they have interior drainage - Atuel River, Diamante River, Tunuyan River
- Areic watersheds: they lack of drainage and could be found in the center-west of the chaquenean plain, on the west of the pampean region and in some patagonic areas

On the other hand, lakes and lagoons are permanent accumulations of water over impervious depressions. Their difference is mainly based on their extension and depth. They are very important for stream regulation, as a source of energy, tourist attraction and its ichthyologic wealth. In Argentina, all major lakes are in Patagonia.

=== Rivers ===
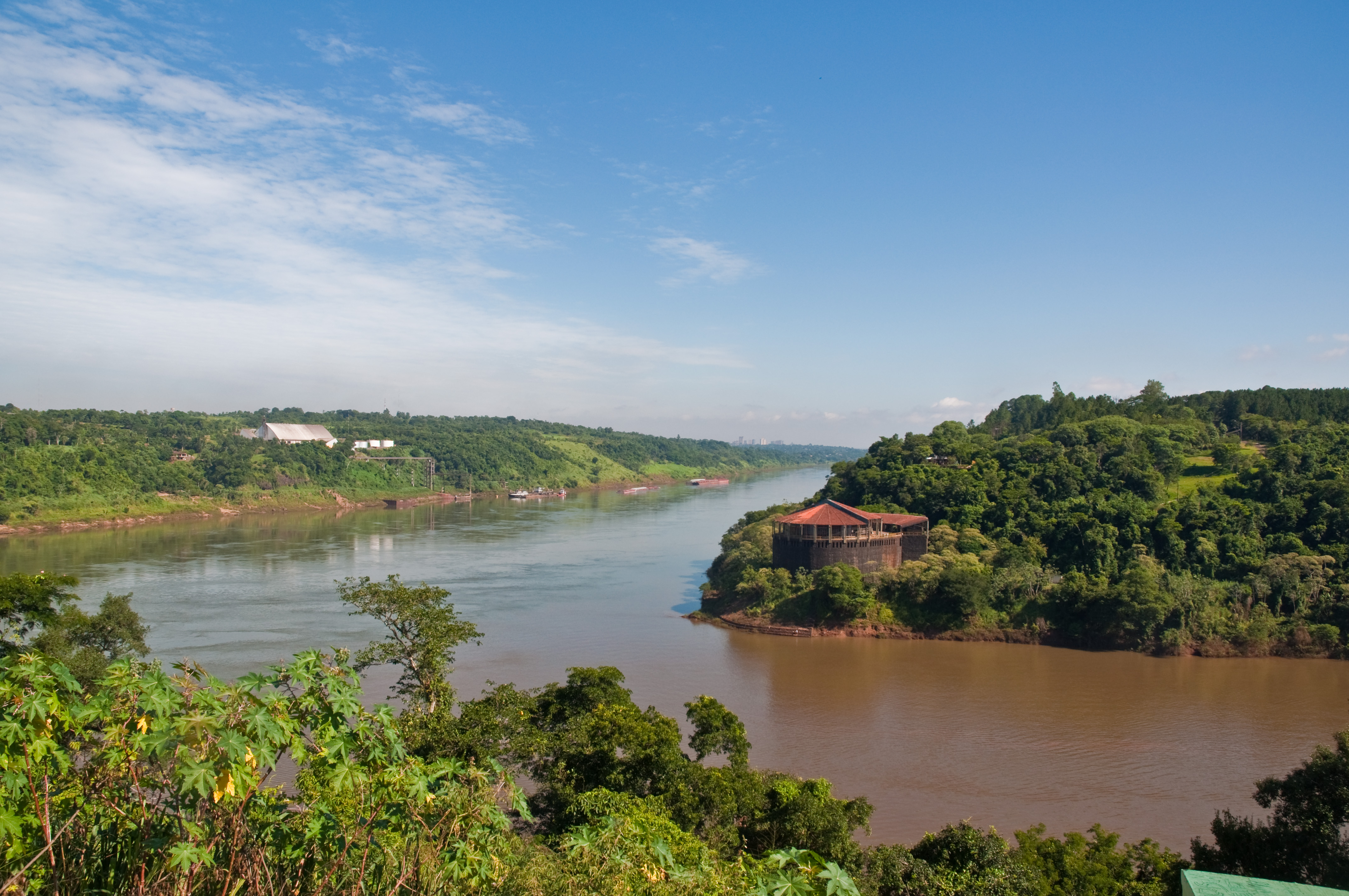
Confluence of the Iguazu and Parana rivers.

Major rivers in Argentina include the Pilcomayo, Paraguay, Bermejo, Colorado, Río Negro, Salado, Uruguay and the largest river, the Paraná. The latter two flow together before meeting the Atlantic Ocean, forming the estuary of the Río de la Plata. Regionally important rivers are the Atuel and Mendoza in the homonymous province, the Chubut in Patagonia, the Río Grande in Jujuy, and the San Francisco River in Salta.

=== Lakes ===
There are several large lakes in Argentina, many of them in Patagonia. Among these are lakes Argentino and Viedma in Santa Cruz, Nahuel Huapi in Río Negro and Fagnano in Tierra del Fuego, and Colhué Huapi and Musters in Chubut. Lake Buenos Aires and O'Higgins/San Martín Lake are shared with Chile. Mar Chiquita, Córdoba, is the largest saltwater lake in the country. There are numerous reservoirs created by dams. Argentina features various hot springs, such as those at Termas de Río Hondo with temperatures between 30 °C and 65 °C.

A recent global remote sensing analysis suggested that there were 3,091 km^{2} of tidal flats in Argentina, making it the ninth ranked country in terms of how much tidal flat occurs there.

== Climate ==
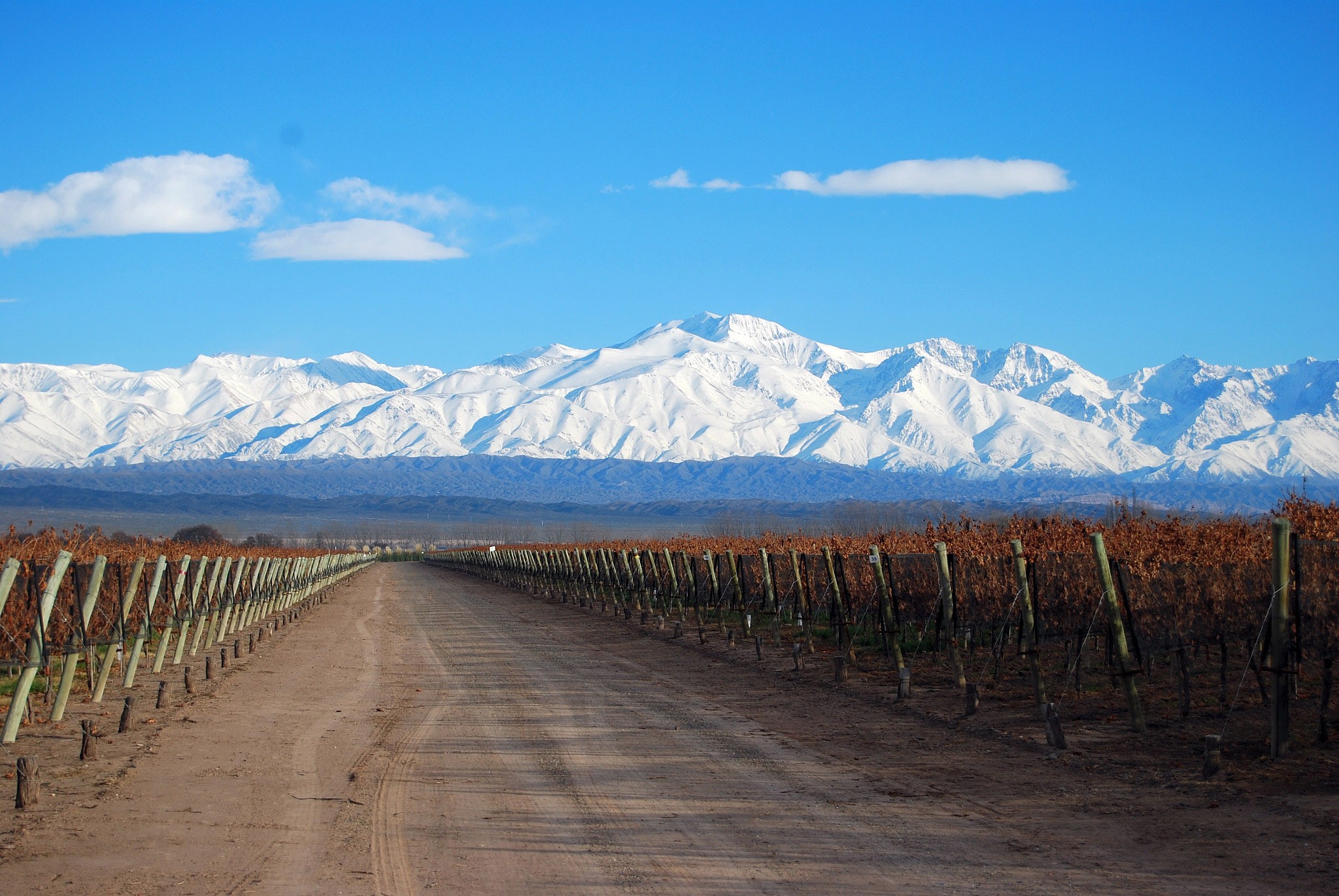
Chakana Winery Plantation in Luján de Cuyo, Mendoza.

Argentina is subject to a variety of climates. The north of the country, including latitudes in and below the Tropic of Capricorn, is characterized by very hot, wet summers (which result in a number of swamp lands) with mild drier winters, and is subject to periodic droughts during the winter season.

Central Argentina has hot summers with tornadoes and thunderstorms (in western Argentina producing some of the world's largest hail), and cool winters. The southern regions have warm summers and cold winters with heavy snowfall, especially in mountainous zones. Higher elevations at all latitudes experience cooler conditions.

== Political geography ==
Argentina borders six countries with one, near the Falkland Islands, being a maritime border with the United Kingdom. Its largest and the world's second largest international land border is with Chile, which is 5,308 km (3,298 mi) long. The Argentina–Paraguay border is 1,699 km (1,056 mi) long.

Strategic importance:

- Location relative to sea lanes between South Atlantic and South Pacific Oceans (Strait of Magellan, Beagle Channel, Drake Passage)

=== Territorial claims ===
- Land claims
  - Falkland Islands
  - South Georgia and the South Sandwich Islands
  - Argentine Antarctica
  - Desert Lake
- Maritime claims on Argentine Sea
  - Territorial sea: 12 nmi (22.2 km; 13.8 mi)
  - Contiguous zone: 24 nmi (44.4 km; 27.6 mi)
  - Exclusive economic zone: 1,159,063 km^{2} (447,517 mi^{2})
  - Continental shelf: 200 nmi (370.4 km; 230.2 mi) or to the edge of the continental margin
  - Elevation: 595 m (0.595 km; 0.370 mi)

== National parks ==
The National Parks of Argentina make up a network of thirty national parks in Argentina. The parks cover a very varied set of terrains and biotopes, from Baritú National Park on the northern border with Bolivia to Tierra del Fuego National Park in the far south of the continent (see List of national parks of Argentina).

The creation of the National Parks dates back to the 1903 donation of 73 square kilometers of land in the Lake District in the Andes foothills by Francisco Moreno. This formed the nucleus of a larger protected area in Patagonia around San Carlos de Bariloche. In 1934, a law was passed creating the National Parks system, formalizing the protected area as the Nahuel Huapi National Park and creating the Iguazú National Park. The National Park Police Force was born, enforcing the new laws preventing tree-felling and hunting. Their early task was largely to establish national sovereignty over these disputed areas and to protect borders.

Five further national parks were declared in 1937 in Patagonia and the service planned new towns and facilities to promote tourism and education. Six more were declared by 1970.

In 1970 a new law established new categories of protection, so that there now were National Parks, National Monuments, Educational Reserves and Natural Reserves. Three national parks were declared in the 1970s. In 1980, another new law affirmed the status of national parks - this law is still in place. The 1980s saw the service reaching out to local communities and local government to help in the running and development of the national parks. Ten more national parks were created with local co-operation, sometimes at local instigation. In 2000, Mburucuyá and Copo National Parks were declared, and El Leoncito natural reserve was upgraded to a national park.

The headquarters of the National Park Service are in downtown Buenos Aires, on Santa Fe Avenue. A library and information center are open to the public. The administration also covers the national monuments, such as the Petrified Forest, and natural and educational reserves.

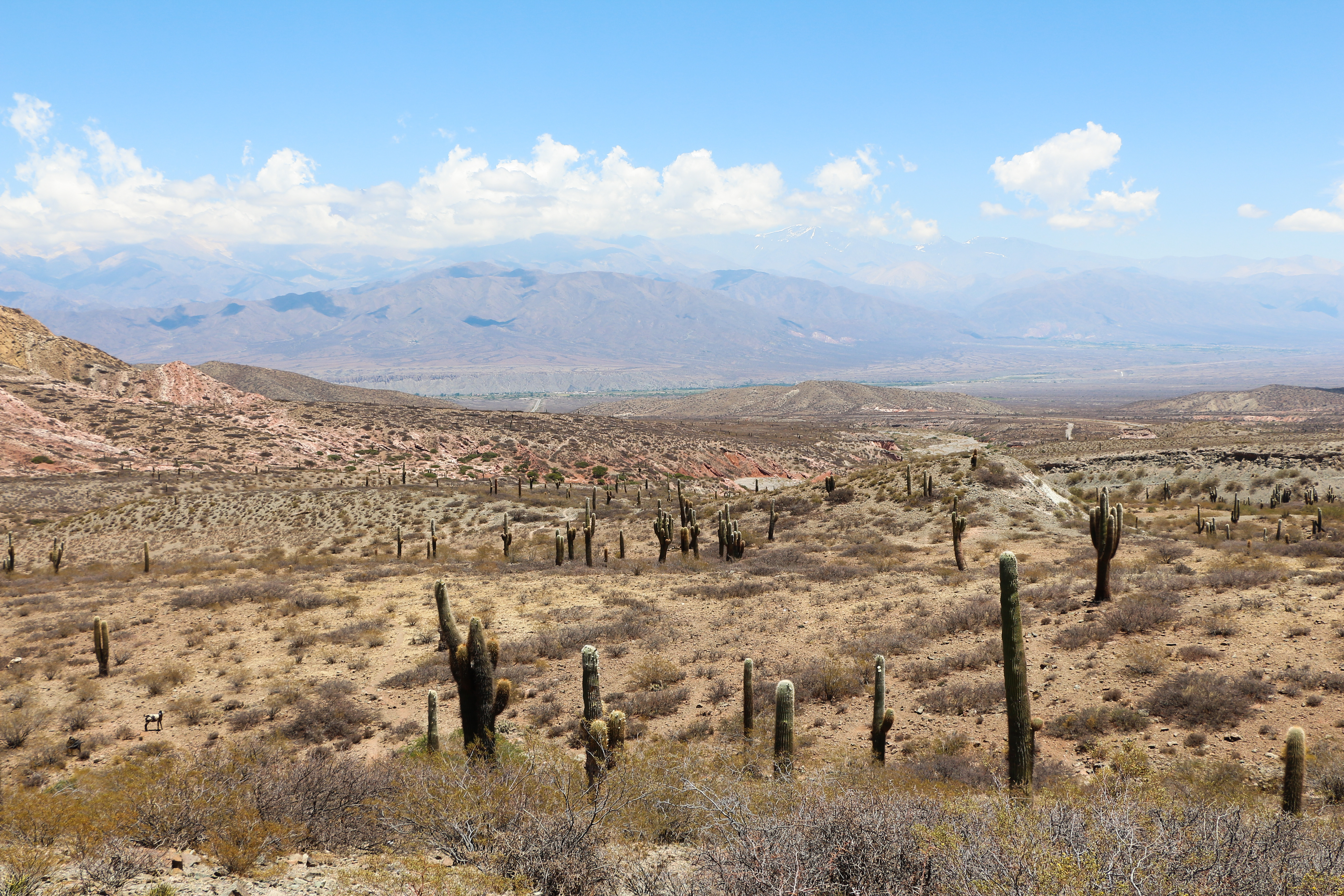
Los Cardones National Park

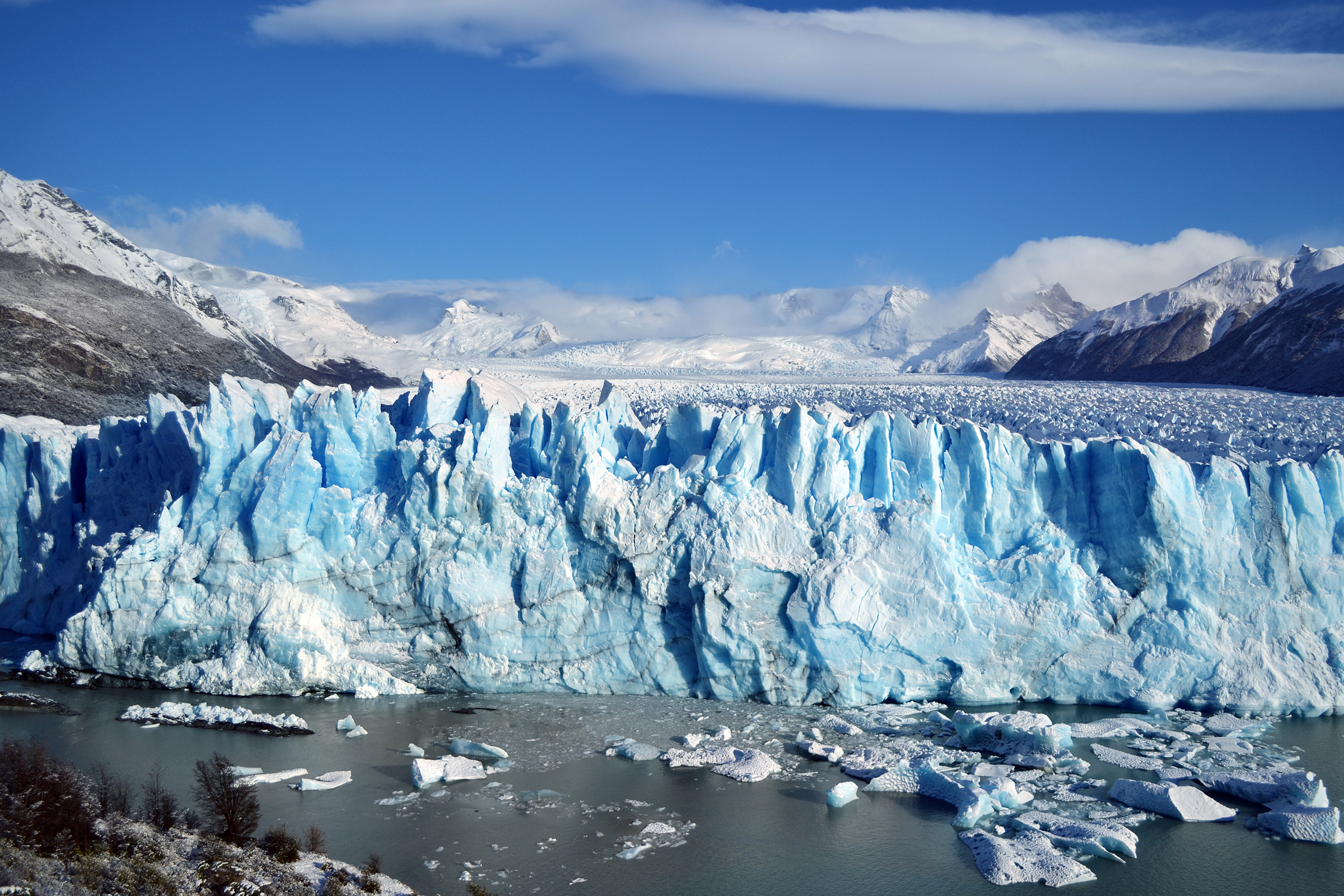
Los Glaciares National Park

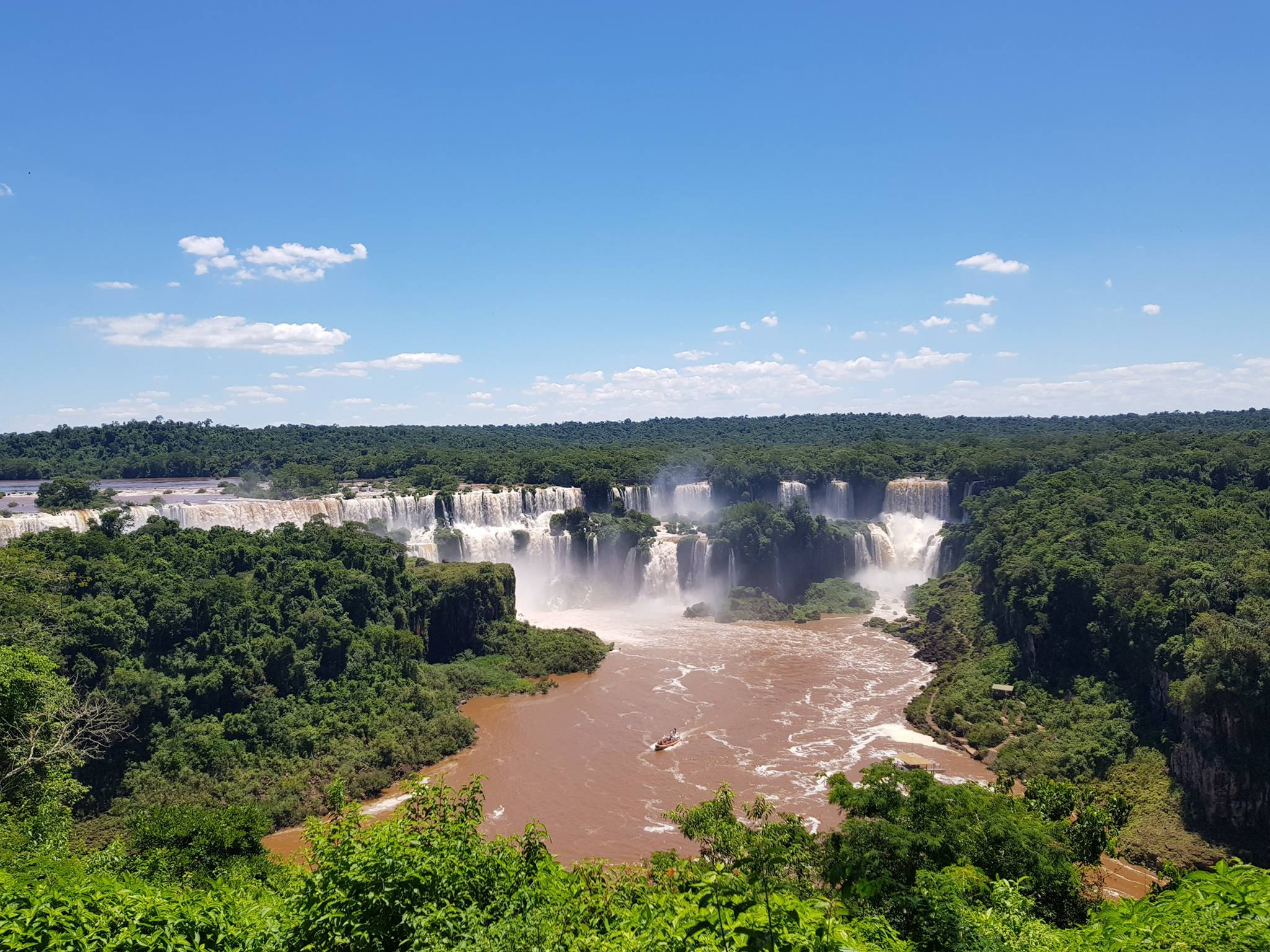
Iguazú National Park

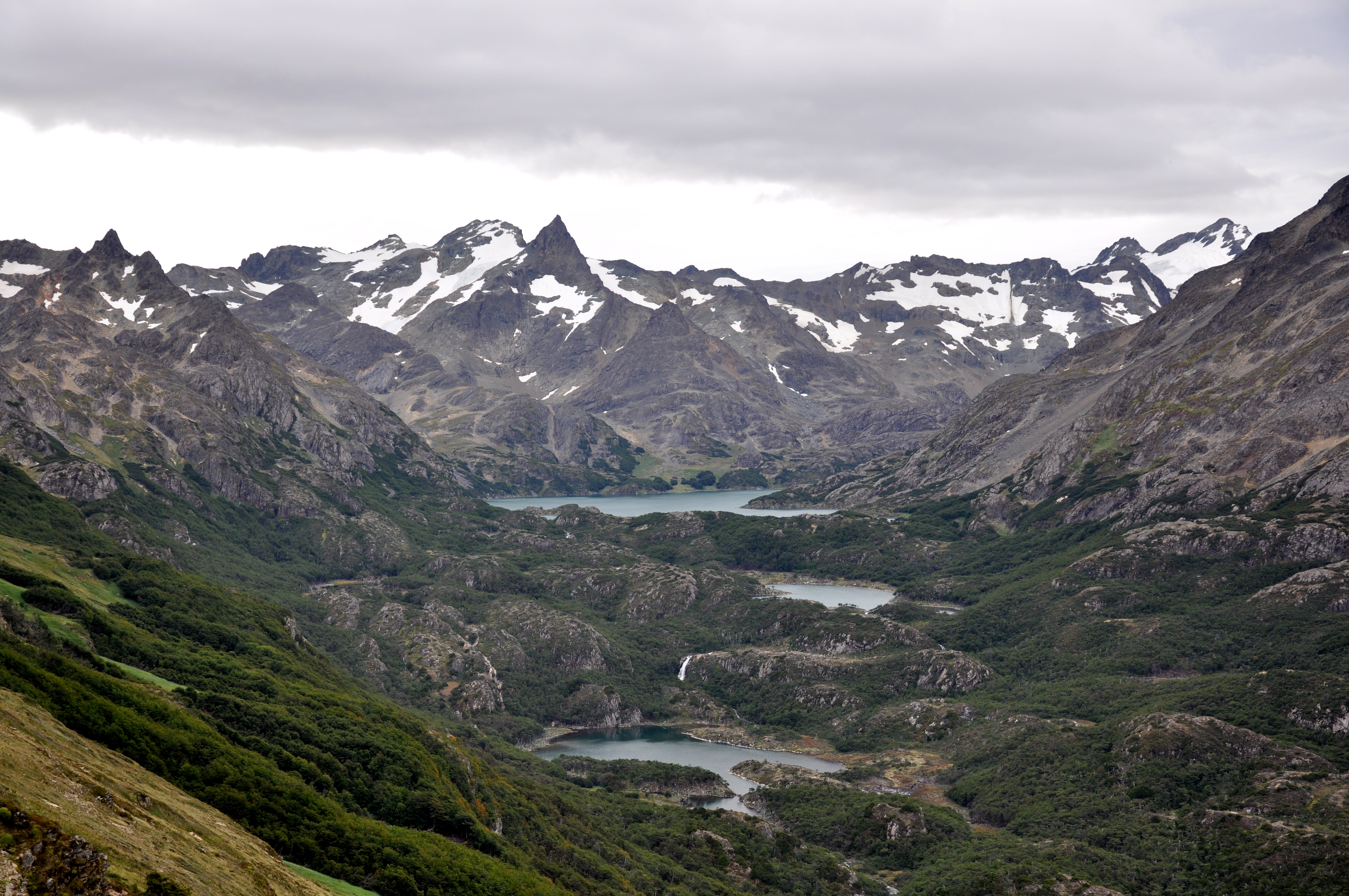
Tierra del Fuego National Park

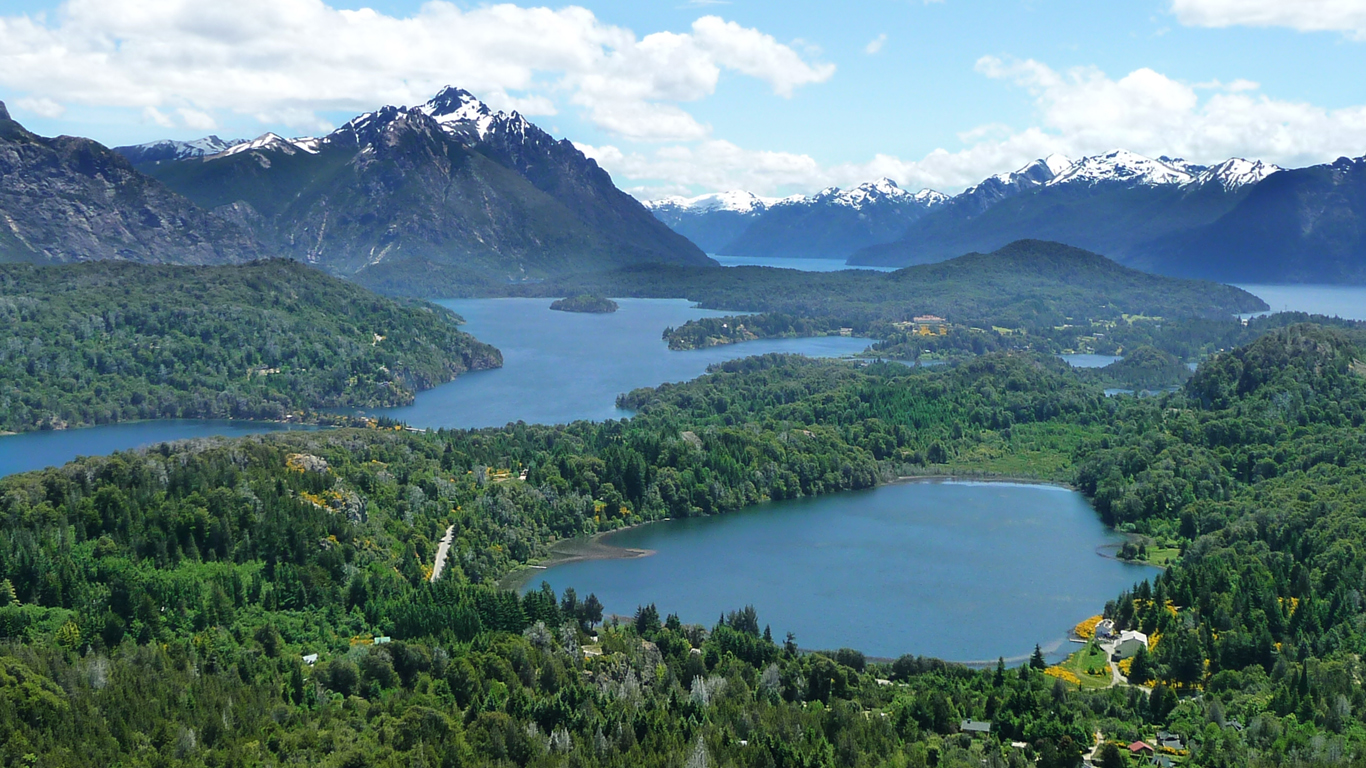
Nahuel Huapi National Park

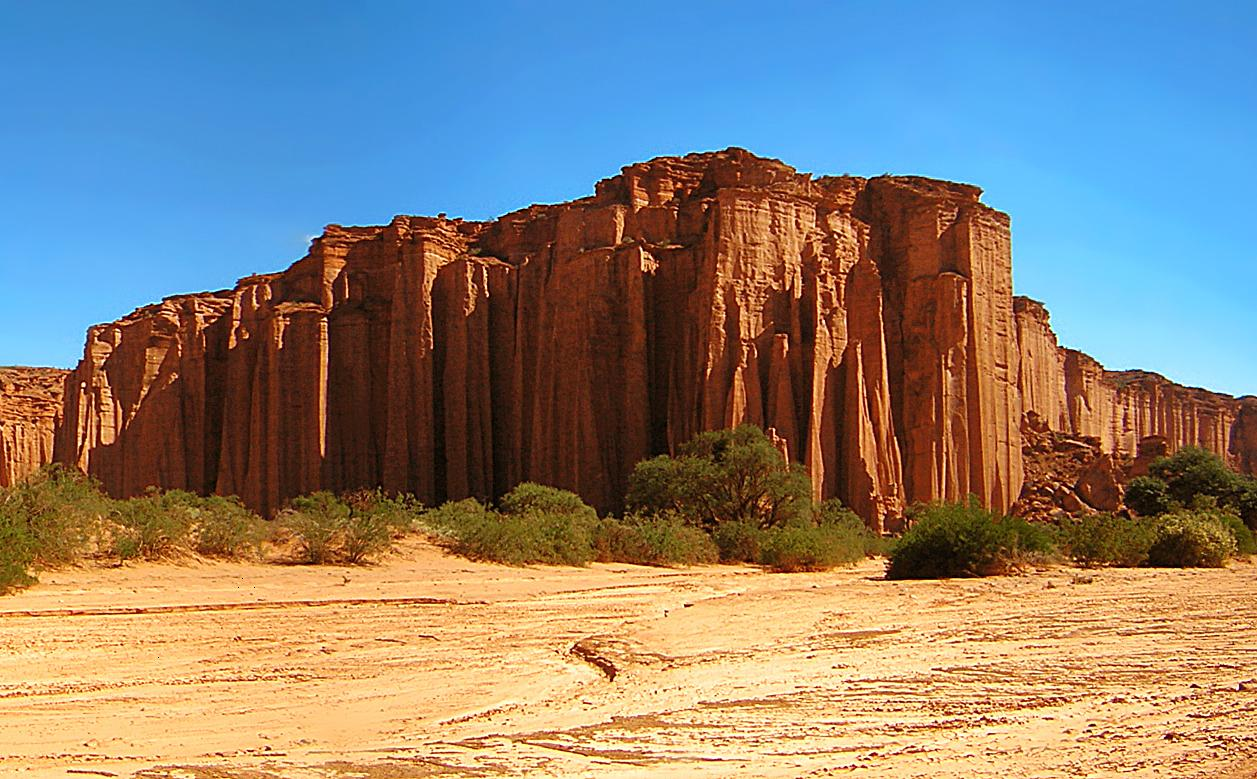
Talampaya National Park

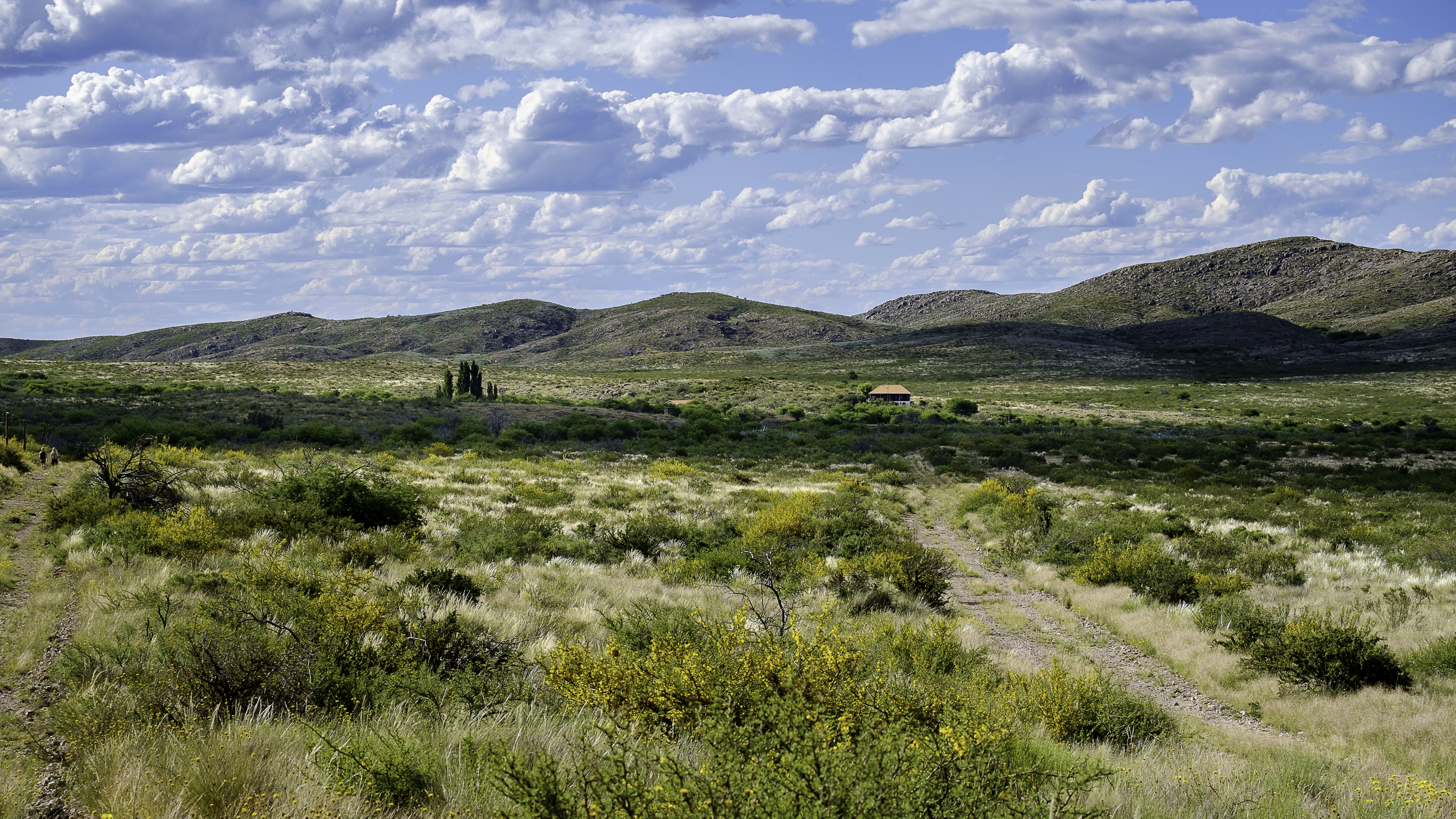
Lihué Calel National Park

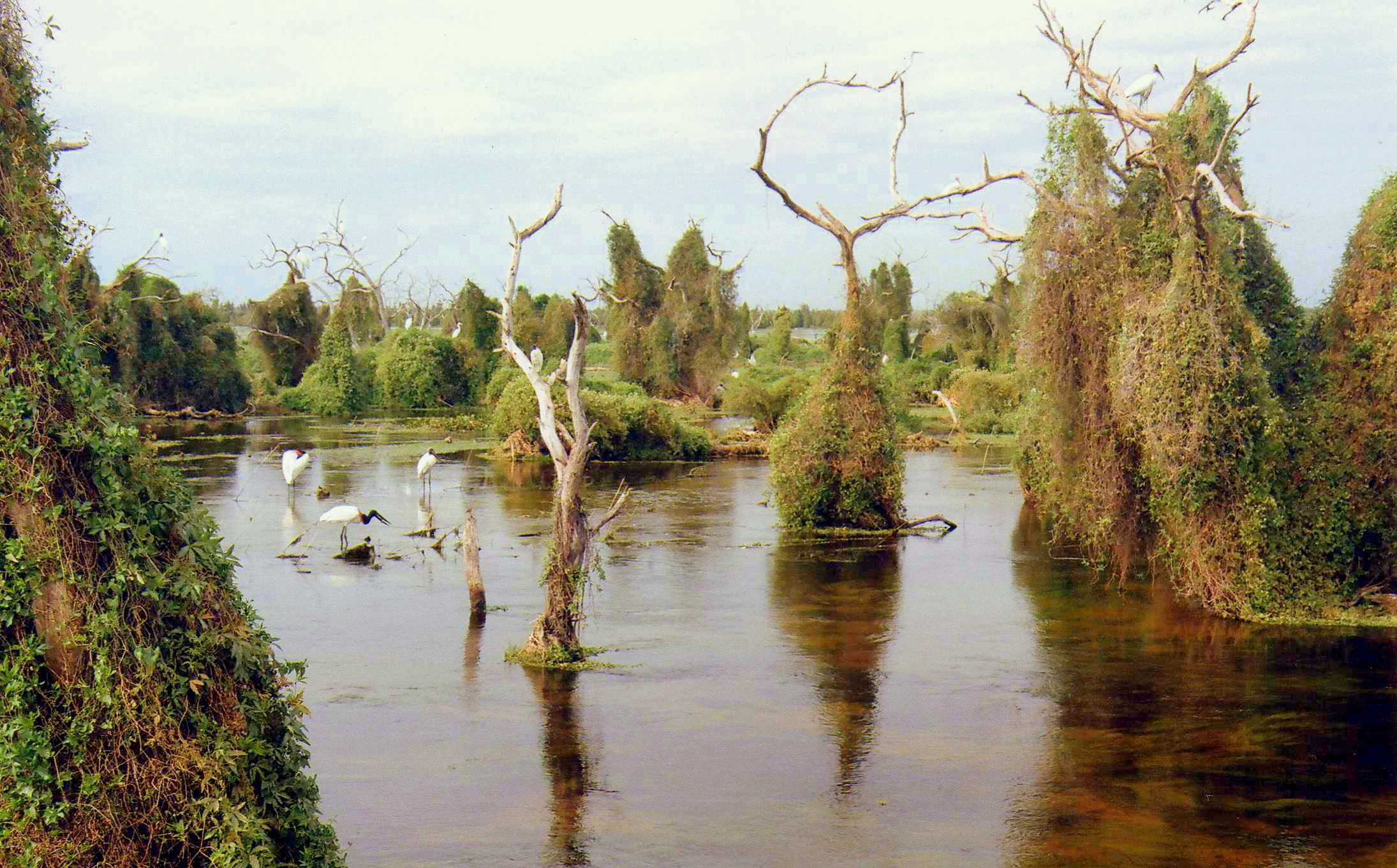
Río Pilcomayo National Park

== See also ==
- List of islands of Argentina
- List of volcanoes in Argentina
- Protected areas of Argentina
- Wikimedia Atlas of Argentina

== Bibliography ==
- UT Perry–Castañeda Map - Argentina Map Website Map
- Carlevari I. y R. Carlevari. 2007. La Argentina. Geografía económica y humana.14° edición. Alfaomega grupo editor. 543 pp.
- Menutti, Adela (1980). Geografía Argentina y Universal [Argentine and universal geography]. Edil.
