= List of national parks of Argentina =

Argentina has 35 national parks covering a very varied set of terrains and biotopes, from Baritú National Park on the northern border with Bolivia to Tierra del Fuego National Park in the far south of the continent. The Administración de Parques Nacionales (National Parks Administration) is the agency that preserves and manages these national parks along with Natural monuments and National Reserves within the country.

The headquarters of the National Parks Service are in downtown Buenos Aires, on Santa Fe Avenue. A library and information centre are open to the public. The administration also covers the national monuments, such as the Jaramillo Petrified Forest, and natural and educational reserves.

== History ==
The creation of the National Parks dates back to the 1903 donation of 75 km^{2} (29 sq mi) of land in the Lake District in the Andes foothills by Francisco Moreno, the renowned explorer and academic in Argentina. This formed the nucleus of a larger protected area in Patagonia around San Carlos de Bariloche. At the beginning of the 1920s there was an amazing revival of the national park idea at Lake Nahuel Huapí, which led to the official establishment of the Parque Nacional del Sud on 8 April 1922 by decree of President Yrigoyen. In 1934, a law was passed creating the National Parks system, formalising the protected area as the Nahuel Huapi National Park and creating the Iguazú National Park. Thus, Argentina was the third country in the Americas, after United States and Canada to establish a national parks system. The National Park Police Force was born, enforcing the new laws preventing tree-felling and hunting. Under the direction of the founding director of the National Direction of National Parks Exequiel Bustillo, a conception of national parks focused on economic development and colonization of the region was developed. Beyond touristic development the aim of the parks was to establish national sovereignty over peripherical areas and to protect national borders. Five further national parks were declared in 1937 in Patagonia and the service planned new towns and facilities to promote tourism and education. Six more were declared by 1970.

In 1970 a new law established new categories of protection: National Parks, National Monuments, Educational Reserves, and Natural Reserves. Three national parks were designated in the 1970s. In 1980, another new law affirmed the status of national parks – this law is still in place. The 1980s saw the service reaching out to local communities and local government to help in the running and development of the national parks. Ten more national parks were created with local co-operation, sometimes at local instigation. In 2000, Mburucuyá and Copo National Parks were declared, and El Leoncito natural reserve was upgraded to a national park. Currently, there are 41 protected areas in Argentina, which cover an area of 37,000 km^{2} (14,286 sq mi) or about 1.5% of the total land area in Argentina.

== Map ==
National parks of Argentina

== National Parks ==
- ‡ World Heritage Site

Name	Image	Province Coordinates	Creation	Area	Visitors (2015)	Ref
Aconquija		Tucumán; 26.48°S 65.20°W	4 July 2018	90,000 ha (347 sq mi)	No data	
Baritú		Salta; 22.58°S 64.62°W	24 April 1974	72,439 ha (280 sq mi)	938	
Bosques Petrificados de Jaramillo		Santa Cruz; 47.67°S 68.09°W	27 December 2012	78,543 ha (303 sq mi)	6,535	
Calilegua		Jujuy; 23.69°S 64.79°W	25 July 1979	76,306 ha (295 sq mi)	13,667	
Campos del Tuyú		Buenos Aires; 36.35°S 56.87°W	4 June 2009	3,040 ha (12 sq mi)	Not allowed	
Chaco		Chaco; 26.83°S 59.66°W	22 October 1954	14,981 ha (58 sq mi)	4,913	
Copo		Santiago del Estero; 25.85°S 61.91°W	28 December 2000	118,119 ha (456 sq mi)	444	
El Impenetrable		Chaco; 24.99°S 61.08°W	30 October 2014	128,000 ha (494 sq mi)	Not allowed	
El Leoncito		San Juan; 31.92°S 69.24°W	15 October 2002	89,706 ha (346 sq mi)	16,343	
El Palmar		Entre Ríos; 31.87°S 58.25°W	30 November 1965	8,213 ha (32 sq mi)	175,414	
El Rey		Salta; 24.67°S 64.63°W	2 July 1948	44,162 ha (171 sq mi)	1,204	
Iberá		Corrientes; 27.93°S 59.07°W	20 December 2018	183,500 ha (708 sq mi)		
Iguazú‡		Misiones; 25.64°S 54.34°W	29 October 1934	67,620 ha (261 sq mi)	1,349,801	
Islas de Santa Fe		Santa Fe; 32.27°S 60.71°W	15 November 2010	4,096 ha (16 sq mi)	Not allowed	
Islote Lobos		Río Negro; 41.44°S 65.06°W	30 July 2020	19,079 ha (74 sq mi)	Not allowed	
Lago Puelo		Chubut; 42.17°S 71.69°W	16 November 1971	27,675 ha (107 sq mi)	120,554	
Laguna Blanca		Neuquén; 39.03°S 70.35°W	29 May 1945	11,251 ha (43 sq mi)	938	
Lanín		Neuquén; 39.89°S 71.48°W	29 May 1945	412,003 ha (1,591 sq mi)	51,321	
Lihué Calel		La Pampa; 37.95°S 65.61°W	8 June 1976	32,500 ha (125 sq mi)	7,582	
Los Alerces‡		Chubut; 42.87°S 71.87°W	29 May 1945	263,000 ha (1,015 sq mi)	143,943	
Los Arrayanes		Neuquén; 40.83°S 71.61°W	16 November 1971	1,840 ha (7 sq mi)	No data	
Los Cardones		Salta; 25.28°S 65.92°W	13 December 1996	65,000 ha (251 sq mi)	72,947	
Los Glaciares‡		Santa Cruz; 50.00°S 73.13°W	29 May 1945	726,927 ha (2,807 sq mi)	542,794	
Mburucuyá		Corrientes; 28.02°S 58.07°W	17 January 2002	17,086 ha (66 sq mi)	3,136	
Monte León		Santa Cruz; 50.34°S 68.90°W	10 November 2004	62,169 ha (240 sq mi)	6,762	
Nahuel Huapi		Río Negro and Neuquén; 40.87°S 71.49°W	29 October 1934	712,160 ha (2,750 sq mi)	279,360	
Patagonia		Santa Cruz; 47.16°S 71.32°W	21 January 2015	53,000 ha (205 sq mi)	Not allowed	
Perito Moreno		Santa Cruz; 47.92°S 72.25°W	29 May 1945	127,120 ha (491 sq mi)	177	
Predelta		Entre Ríos; 32.15°S 60.63°W	13 January 1992	2,608 ha (10 sq mi)	74,217	
Quebrada del Condorito		Córdoba; 31.67°S 64.77°W	19 December 1996	35,393 ha (137 sq mi)	22,079	
Río Pilcomayo		Formosa; 25.05°S 58.13°W	17 October 1951	50,417 ha (195 sq mi)	10,186	
San Guillermo		San Juan; 29.31°S 69.29°W	13 January 1999	166,000 ha (641 sq mi)	No data	
Sierra de las Quijadas		San Luis; 32.55°S 67.12°W	10 December 1991	73,785 ha (285 sq mi)	29,599	
Talampaya‡		La Rioja; 29.90°S 68.01°W	10 July 1997	215,000 ha (830 sq mi)	63,797	
Tierra del Fuego		Tierra del Fuego; 54.65°S 68.47°W	25 October 1960	68,909 ha (266 sq mi)	265,633	
Traslasierra		Córdoba; 31.15°S 65.49°W	21 March 2018	105,385 ha (407 sq mi)	Not allowed	

== See also ==
- List of World Heritage Sites in Argentina
- List of UNESCO Biosphere Reserves in Argentina
