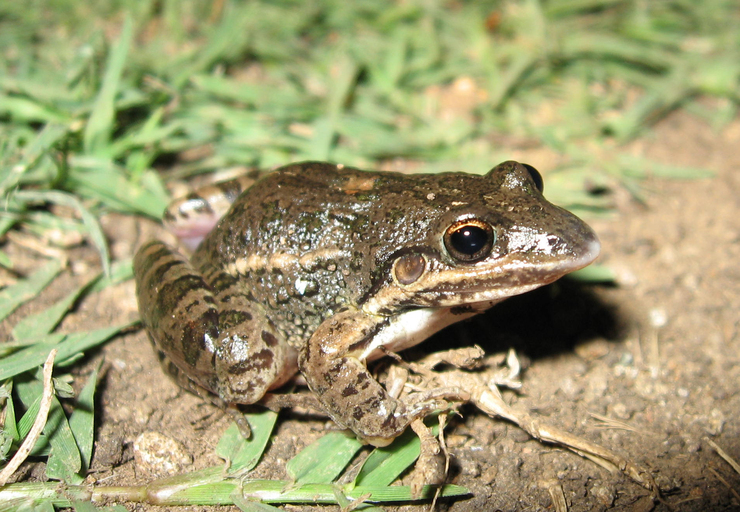

Conservation status
- Least Concern (IUCN 3.1)

Scientific classification
- Kingdom: Animalia
- Phylum: Chordata
- Class: Amphibia
- Order: Anura
- Family: Leptodactylidae
- Genus: Leptodactylus
- Species: L. latinasus

Binomial name
- Leptodactylus latinasus Jiménez de la Espada, 1875

Synonyms
- Leptodactylus prognathus Boulenger, 1888; Leptodactylus anceps Gallardo, 1964

= Leptodactylus latinasus =

Species of frog

Leptodactylus latinasus (common name: oven frog, in Spanish urnero) is a species of frog in the family Leptodactylidae. It is found in the Gran Chaco of northern Argentina, Bolivia, and Paraguay and east and south to southern Brazil and Uruguay.

== Habitat ==
These frogs inhabit Chaco, Pampa, and Atlantic Forest biomes. It can tolerate many different types of habitat and considerable anthropogenic disturbance. This frog is terrestrial and is usually found near water. Scientists observed the frog between 0 and 600 meters above sea level.

Scientists have reported the frog in many protected places: Reserva Natural Formosa, Chaco National Park, Mburucuyá National Park, El Rey National Park, Parque Nacional Calilegua, Paisaje Protegido Quebrada de los Cuervos, Paisaje Protegido Valle del Lunarejo, Cerro Verde Área de manejo de hábitats y/o especies, Humedales del Santa Lucia Área Protegida con Recursos Manejados, Laureles-Canias Managed Protected Area Resource, Sierra de San Javier Parque Universitario, Horco Molle Reserva Universitaria, Aguas Chiquitas Reserva Natural, Rio Los Sosa Reserva Natural, Iberá Reserva Natural Provincial, Bahía de Samborombón Reserva Natural Integral, El Gato y Lomas Limpias Reserva de Uso Multiple, El Bagual Private Reserve, Kaa-iya del Gran Chaco, and Área de Proteção Ambiental Do Banhado Grande. Its range also overlaps APA do Ibirapuita, ESEC do Taim, PARES Itapeva, PARES Turvo, REBIO Lami Jose Lutzenberger, and REBIO Sao Donato.

== Anatomy ==
It is now known to have kneecaps, a feature previously unknown in amphibians and thought to have evolved in different taxonomic classes, the reptile and the mammal.

== Reproduction ==
This frog lays eggs underground. When it rains, the tadpoles escape into nearby bodies of water.

== Threats ==
The IUCN classifies this species as least concern of extinction. In some parts of its range, the frog may be threatened by habitat loss in favor of agriculture. Agrochemicals may also do the frog some harm.
