= Ledesma Department =

Ledesma Departamento Ledesma
- Department
- Interactive map of Ledesma
- Country: Argentina
- Seat: Libertador General San Martín

Area
  - Total: 3,249 km^{2} (1,254 sq mi)
- Elevation: 472 m (1,549 ft)

Population (2022)
  - Total: 94,252
  - Density: 29.01/km^{2} (75.13/sq mi)
- Area Code: 3886

Ledesma is a department of the province of Jujuy (Argentina).

== Towns and villages ==
=== Towns ===
- Libertador General San Martin is the capital of the department of Ledesma

=== Villages ===
- Caimancito
- Calilegua
- Chalicán
- Fraile Pintado
