= Libertador General San Martín =

Libertador General San Martín may refer to:

- José de San Martín (1778–1850), an Argentine general and a leader in South America's struggle for independence from Spain.
- Libertador General San Martín, Jujuy, a town in Argentina named after the general.
