= José Paz =

José Paz may refer to:

- José María Paz (1791–1854), Argentine general and statesman
- José C. Paz (1842–1912), newspaper editor and diplomat of Argentina
- José María Paz (footballer) (born 1978), Argentine football defender
