= Libertador General San Martín, Jujuy =

Libertador General San Martín
- Town

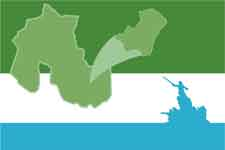
- Flag
- Nickname: Ledesma
- Location in Argentina
- Coordinates: 23°48′S 64°47′W
- Country: Argentina
- Province: Jujuy
- Founded: December 28, 1899

Government
  - Mayor: Jorge Ramón Ale (PJ)
- Elevation: 472 m (1,549 ft)

Population (2010 census)
  - Total: 46,642
- Time zone: UTC−3 (ART)
- Postal code: Y4512
- Area code: 3886

Libertador General San Martín is a town in Jujuy Province, Argentina, and capital of the Ledesma Department, located on the National Route Nº34. It is colloquially called Ledesma or Libertador.

The town was founded under the name of Pueblo Nuevo Ledesma in 1899, on an area donated by the owners of the Ledesma sugar refinery. Two years later, the outline and later subdivision of the eight blocks surrounding the main square was made.

In 1906 the railroad arrived, and the station was built halfway from the town to the industrial centre. The area was enjoyed an economic expansion strengthened by the first Lebanese and Syrian immigration. In 1950 the town was renamed after the Libertador General San Martín. Ledesma S.A.A.I. remains the town's largest employer. The firm maintains sugarcane plantations; fruit orchards, packaging and concentrate facilities; sugar, cellulose, and paper mills; and alcohol fuel facilities.

Located on the banks of the San Francisco River, and only 8 kilometres (5.0 mi) from the entrance to the Calilegua National Park, tourism in the area has recently started to grow. Hot springs and trekking routes are some of the other touristic attractions available to the visitors.

The local Guaraní community performs a traditional Yeyure ceremony called Arete guazú, "Carnaval Grande" or "Pim Pim" in the town every year. This event takes place at the foot of a tree that symbolizes the goddess Pachamama, to whom they offer basil, drinks, cigarettes and Chicha in gratitude. They then dance around in a flurry of streamers, confetti and talcum powder.

== Notable people ==
- Ariel Ortega (born 1974), Argentine football player
- José María Paz (born 1978), Argentine football player
