= Arete guazú =

South American festival

Arete guazú ("big day" or "true day" in the Guarani language, "Arete Guasu" in Spanish) is a traditional Guaraní festival celebrated in Argentina, Bolivia and Paraguay. It is also known as '"Carnaval Grande" (big carnival), "Kandaváre" or "Pim Pim" after the sound of the pin-pin drum played during the ceremonies.

Arete guazú occurs in February each year to celebrate the corn harvest season. In the past, arete guazú was only celebrated if there had been a good harvest; however, since the Guarani people have mostly lost their farmland and urbanized, it is held during carnival. People begin preparing at least eight days before the festivities.

The festival is seen as a spiritual ancestral practice that strengthens the community's ties with each other and with their environment. It reaffirms the indigenous peoples' rights to exist and displays their pride in being indigenous.

== Festival proceedings ==
It begins with a Yerure ceremony at the foot of a tree that symbolizes Pachamama, to whom participants offer basil, drinks, cigarettes and chicha in gratitude. They then dance around in a circle to represent the circle of life and continuity of natural cycles.

Afterwards, a pretend fight occurs between a bull, who represents colonizers, and the "Mascaritas", who are ancestral beings. The bull defeats the Mascaritas.

Finally, a young man dressed as a jaguar, referred to as the Yagua, Jagua Jagua or Yaguareté, slinks into the circle. He confronts and always defeats the bull.

Participants in the festival wear agüeró ("grandparents") masks that represent their dead relatives who they believe dance along with them during the festival.

The festival ends after three days of dancing, drum playing and games for the whole community, young and old. Neighbours of the Guarani, such as the Nivacle and Manjui tribes, may also join in.

== Geography ==
Notable places that celebrate arete guazú include:

Argentina

- Doctor Pedro P. Peña
- Jujuy

Bolivia

- Libertador General San Martín, Jujuy

Paraguay

- Mariscal Estigarribia
