= Calilegua National Park =

Protected area in Jujuy Province, Argentina

- Parque Nacional Calilegua
- IUCN category II (national park)
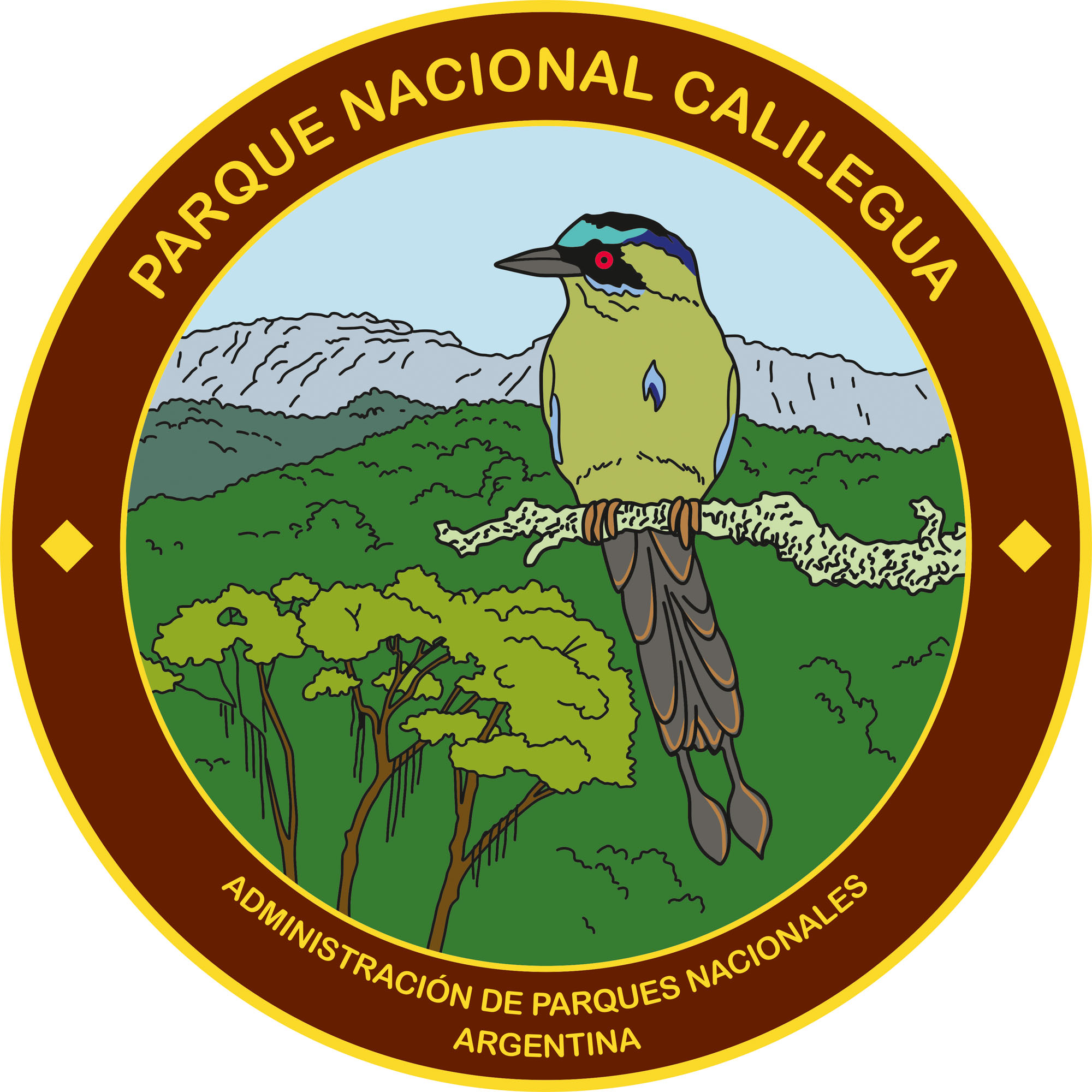
- Emblem of the Calilegua National Park

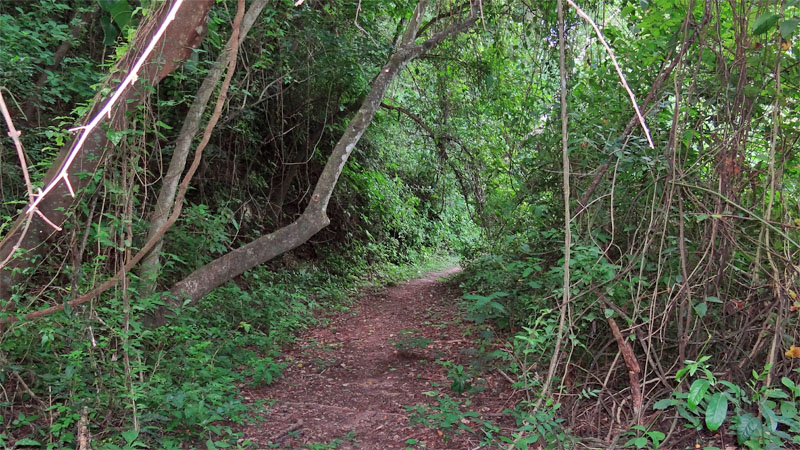
- El Pedemontano trail

- Location within Argentina
- Location: Jujuy Province, Argentina
- Coordinates: 23°39′S 64°47′W
- Area: 76,306 ha (294.62 sq mi)
- Established: July 19, 1979
- Governing body: Administración de Parques Nacionales

Calilegua National Park (Spanish: Parque Nacional Calilegua) is a federally protected area in Jujuy Province, Argentina. It was established on July 19, 1979, and is also the largest protected area in Argentina dedicated to conserving subtropical evergreen mountain rainforests known as Southern Andean Yungas. These Yungas, (otherwise known as the Tucumano-Oranense forest) are transitional zones between the Andean highlands and the eastern forests.

Located at the Ledesma Department on the eastern slopes of the Calilegua hills, with an area of 76,306 ha (763.06 km^{2}; 294.62 sq mi), It is the largest national park in the Argentine Northwest.

== History ==
Originally, the area of Calilegua National Park was occupied by native groups whose settlements were located in the lower knoll near farming grasslands. The archeological pieces and sites found in the park, such as assorted pieces of pottery and polished stone axes, are related to said communities that inhabited the Yungas region. From the 15th century, the Incas had established themselves within the territory, and occupied it. Today, the region is currently inhabited by Kolla communities who immigrated to the region from Bolivia.

== Characteristics ==
There are three landscapes of the park that can be seen when transiting through Provincial Route 83: the jungle foothills, the mountain forest, and the mountain woods. Each region is easy identifiable with its characteristic vegetation.

About 270 species were identified in the park, with an estimated 230 more that could inhabit the area, subsequently making Calilegua the home of 50% of all bird species in the country. The park is home to the jaguar, the largest South American predator, along with other wild cats such as the jaguarundi, ocelot, puma, and the pampas cat. The largest mammal in the Yungas, the tapir, also inhabits the reserve.

Calilegua National Park and nearby towns offer tours related to ecotourism, this is in addition to the area's strong cultural imprint, as any interested tourists may visit several towns where they can experience local customs, language, tradition, and more.

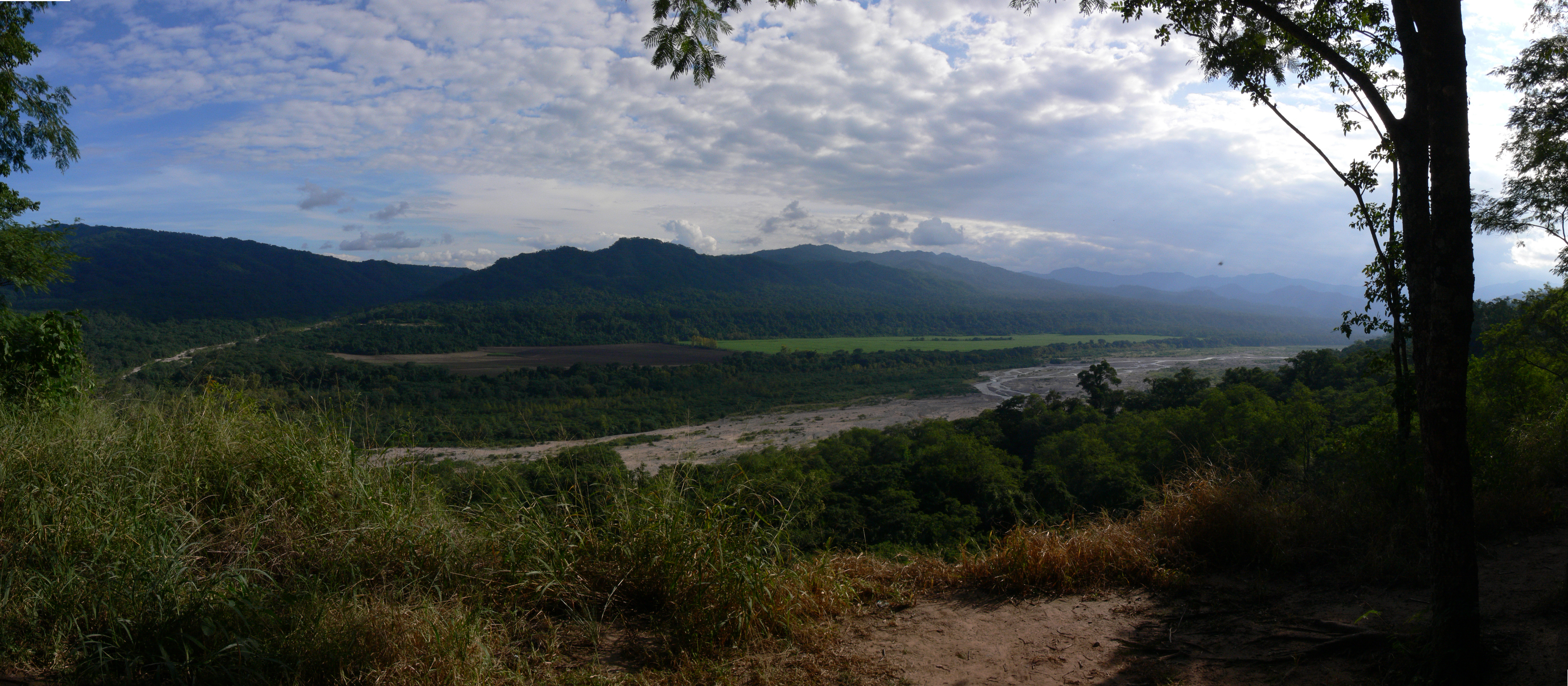
Panorama of San Lorenzo river in Calilegua National Park.

== Climate ==
The park has a subtropical climate with a dry winter season, with mean temperatures fluctuate between 17 °C (62.6 °F) in winter and 28 °C (82.4 °F) in summer. Summers can reach even hotter temperatures up to 40 °C (104.0 °F). In contrast to this, occasional frosts occur at the higher altitudes during the winter. The park receives on average 1,800 mm (71 in) of precipitation per year with most of it falling between November and April. During these months, rainfall is often intense, reassembling that of a downpour.

== See also ==
- Baritú National Park
