= Copo National Park =

Federal protected area in Santiago del Estero Province, Argentina

- Parque Nacional Copo
- IUCN category II (national park)
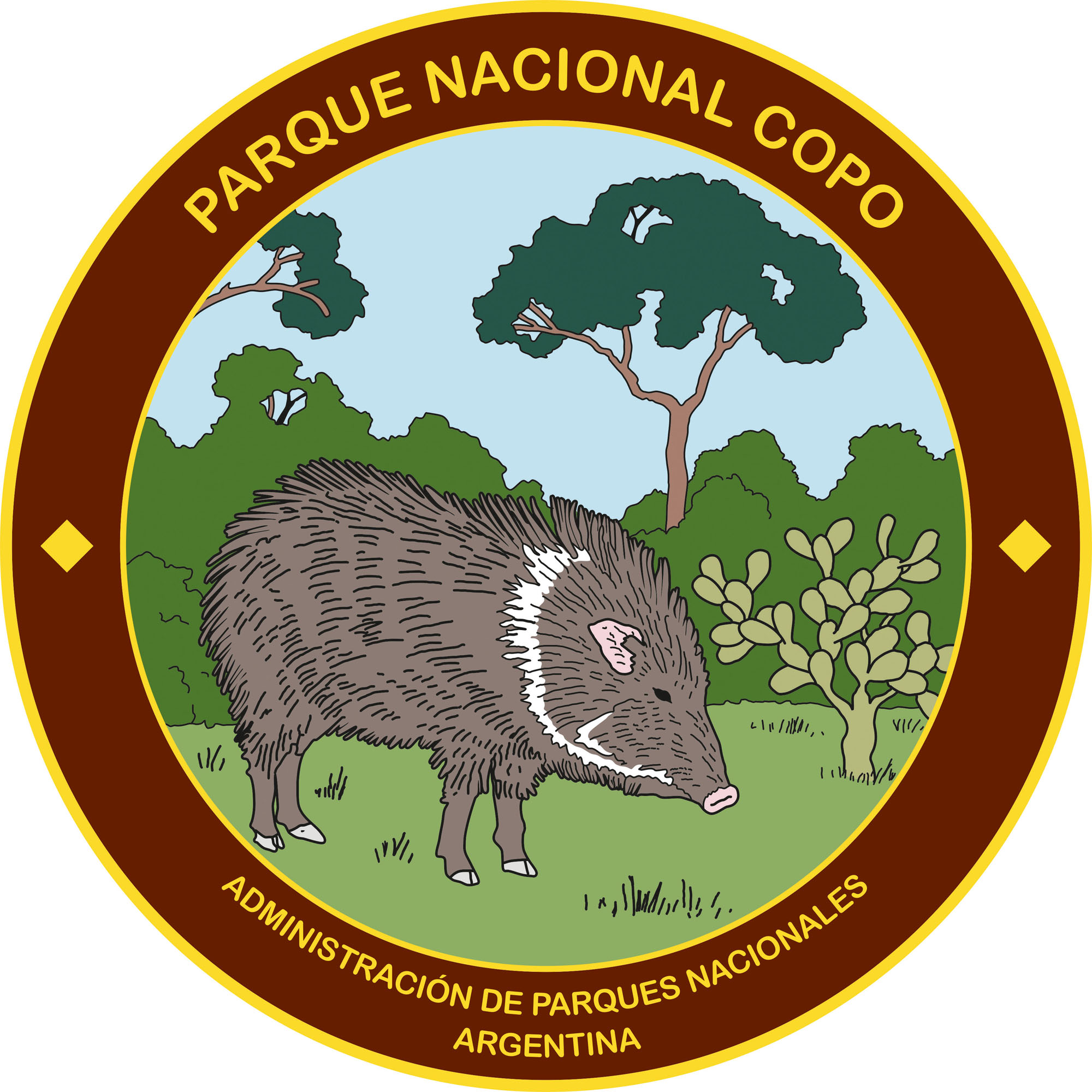
- Emblem of the Copo National Park

- Location within Argentina
- Location: Santiago del Estero Province, Argentina
- Coordinates: 25°58′S 61°53′W
- Area: 118,118 ha (456.06 sq mi)
- Established: November 22, 2000
- Governing body: Administración de Parques Nacionales

Copo National Park (Spanish: Parque Nacional Copo) is a federal protected area in Santiago del Estero Province, Argentina. Established on 22 November 2000, it houses a representative sample of the Dry Chaco biodiversity in average state of conservation. Located in the Copo Department, it has an area of 118,118 ha (1,181.18 km^{2}; 456.06 sq mi).

== Biodiversity ==
The climate is warm, with annual rainfall between 500–700 mm (20–28 in). A large part of the park is made up of forests, with the Santiago red quebracho (quebracho colorado santiagueño) being its characteristic tree species. This tree has a strong wood and high content of tannin, and in the past it suffered a devastating exploitation in other parts of the country. At the beginning of the 20th century, Santiago del Estero was 80% quebracho scrubland; nowadays only 20% remain.

Some of the endangered species that live in this park include the maned wolf, jaguar, the giant anteater, the chacoan peccary and the giant armadillo.

== Bibliography ==
- Maffei, L.; Paredes, R.; Segundo, A.; Noss, A. (2007). "Home range and activity of two sympatric fox species in the Bolivian Dry Chaco" (PDF). Canid News, IUCN/SSC Canid Specialist Group.
