= Chalicán =

Coordinates: 24°04′S 64°48′W

- Municipality and town
- Interactive map of Chalicán
- Country: Argentina
- Province: Jujuy Province
- Time zone: UTC−3 (ART)

Chalicán is a town and municipality located in the southeast of Jujuy Province in Argentina. It is located between San Pedro de Jujuy and Fraile Pintado. The population of Chalicán mainly produces sugar cane and citrus fruits. Fishing also plays a large role in the economy of Chalicán.

On February 17, 2008, Chalicán experienced a flood that caused many inhabitants to have to evacuate.

== Climate ==
Climate data for Chalicán (1935–1982)
Month	Jan	Feb	Mar	Apr	May	Jun	Jul	Aug	Sep	Oct	Nov	Dec	Year
Daily mean °C (°F)	25.9 (78.6)	24.9 (76.8)	23.4 (74.1)	20.3 (68.5)	17.5 (63.5)	14.3 (57.7)	14.2 (57.6)	16.1 (61.0)	19.0 (66.2)	22.6 (72.7)	24.4 (75.9)	25.7 (78.3)	20.7 (69.3)
Average precipitation mm (inches)	132 (5.2)	111 (4.4)	100 (3.9)	46 (1.8)	12 (0.5)	4 (0.2)	2 (0.1)	2 (0.1)	4 (0.2)	26 (1.0)	52 (2.0)	88 (3.5)	579 (22.8)
Source: Instituto Nacional de Tecnología Agropecuaria
