= Lihué Calel National Park =

National park in Argentina

- Parque Nacional Lihué Calel
- IUCN category II (national park)
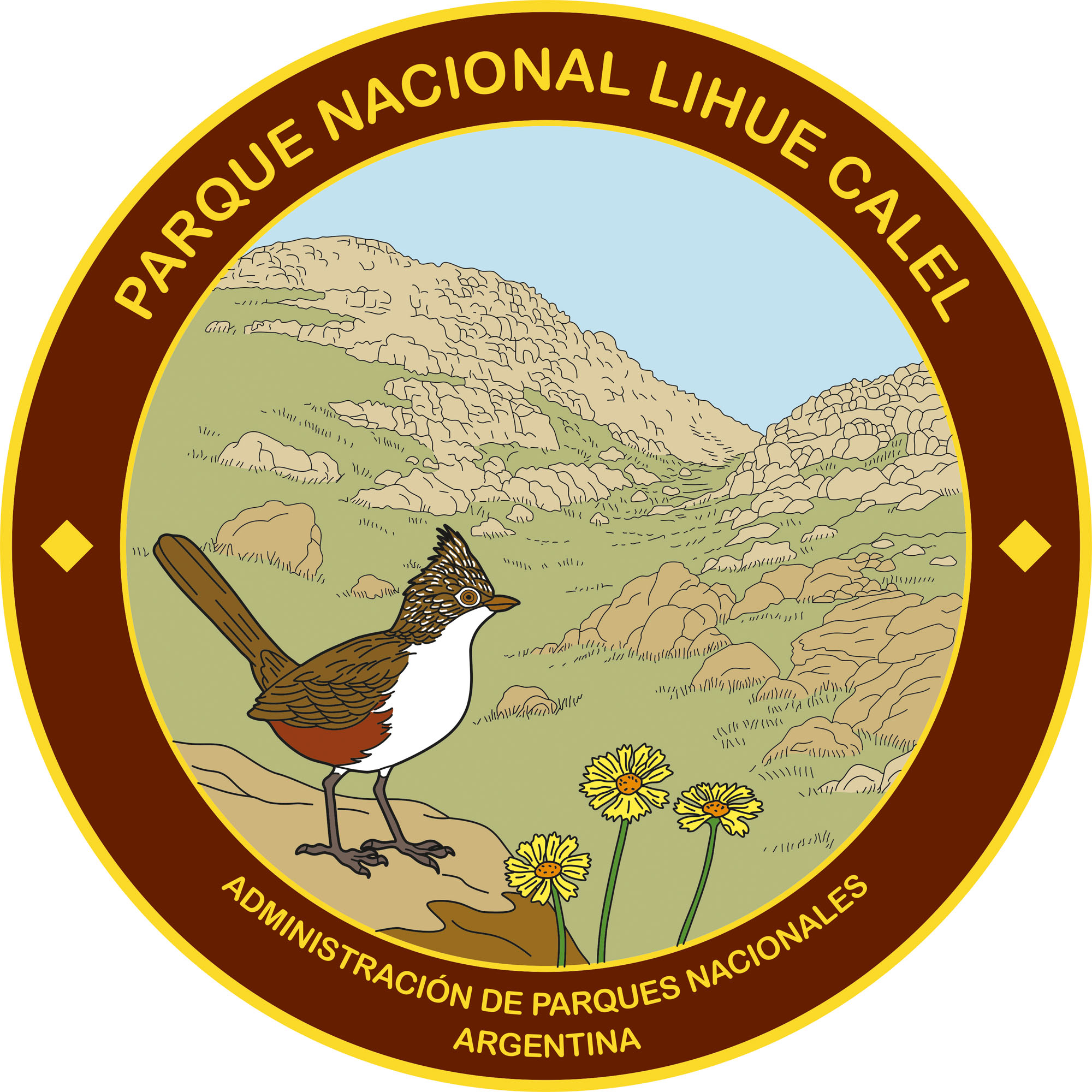
- Emblem of the Lihué Calel National Park

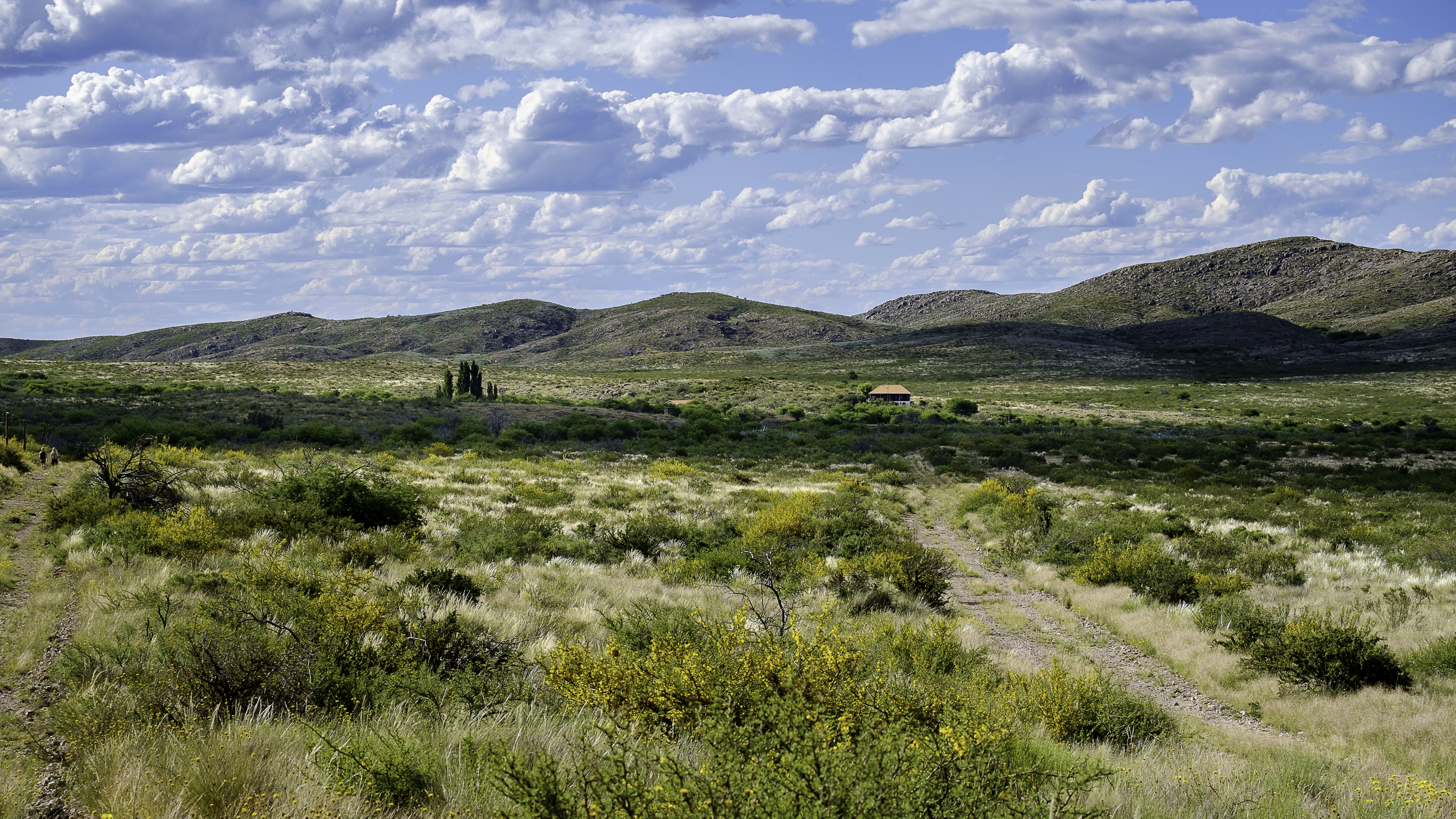
- View of the Lihué Calel National Park

- Location within Argentina
- Location: La Pampa Province, Argentina
- Coordinates: 37.95°S 65.65°W
- Area: 32,514 ha (80,340 acres)
- Established: 1977

Lihué Calel National Park (Spanish: Parque Nacional Lihué Calel) (Mapudungun Lihue = "life" and Calel "mountainous area", "mountains of life") is a national park in Argentina, located in the Lihue Calel Department, in the center of La Pampa Province. The area is one of mountain plains and plateaux, and is known for its grass tussocks. The park covers 324 square kilometres, and was established in 1977.

The Lihué Calel National Park is situated 230 kilometers from Santa Rosa, 121 kilometers from General Acha, and 35 kilometers from Puelches.

== Gallery ==
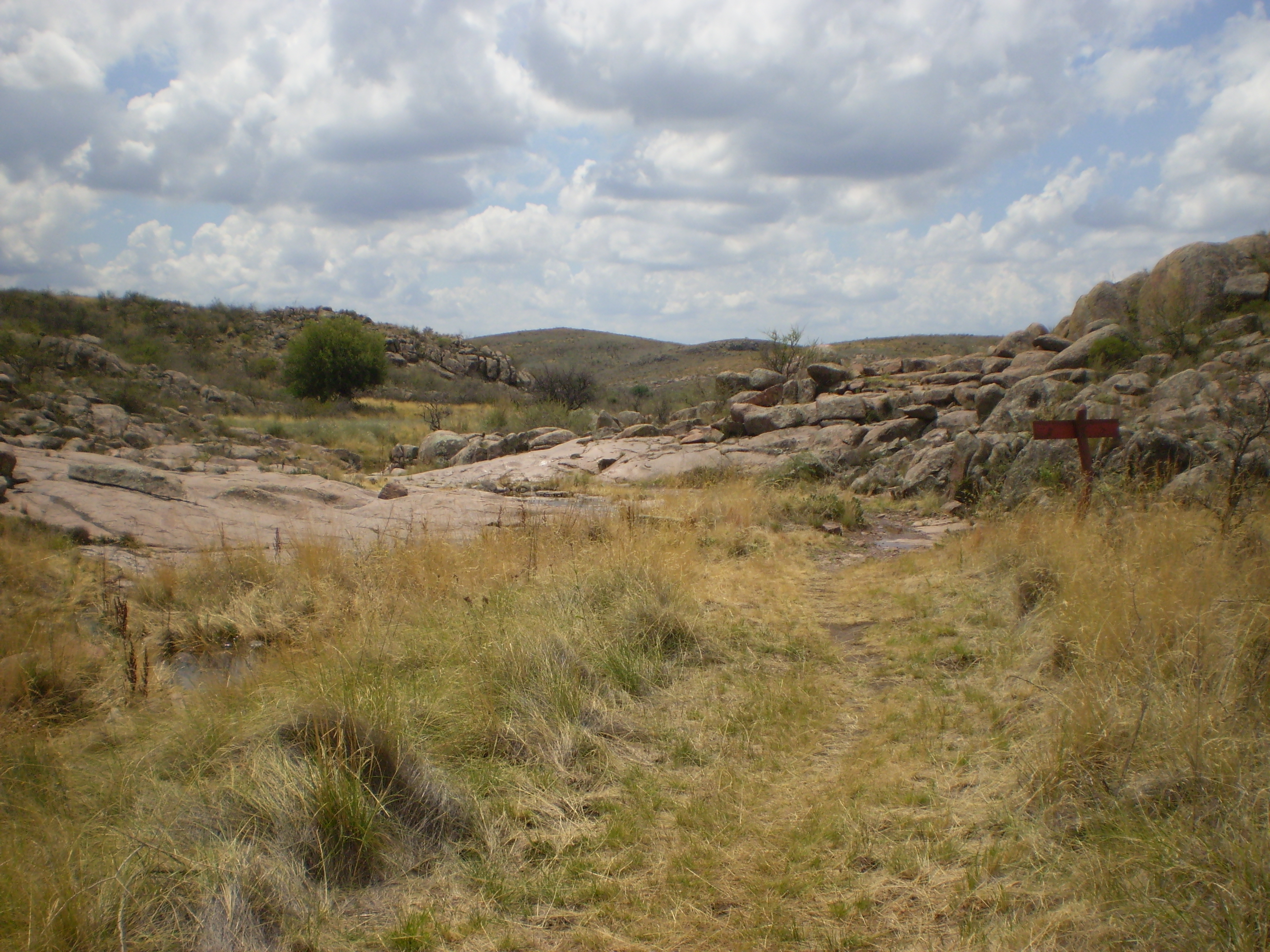
View of the Lihué Calel National Park.

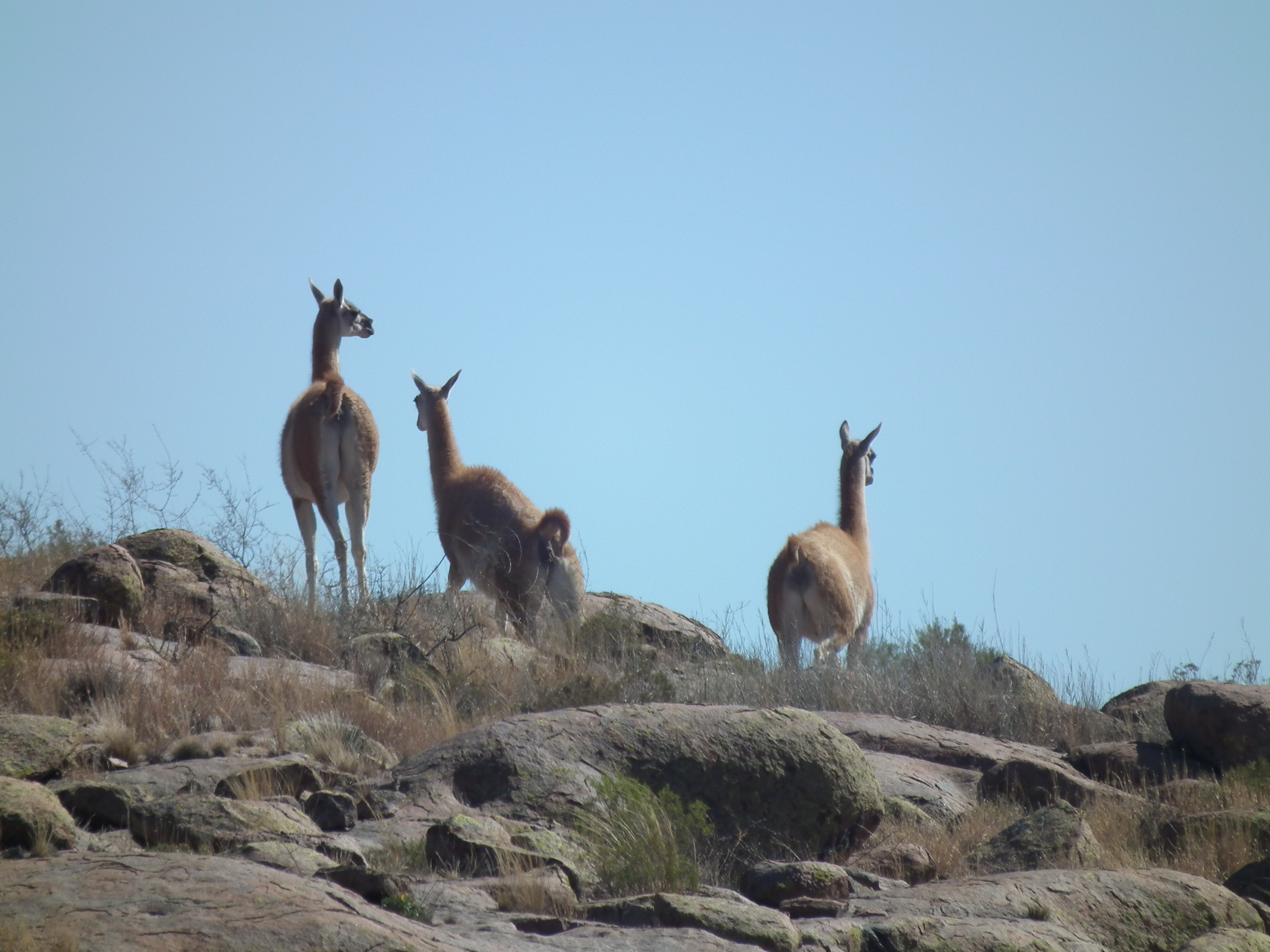
Guanacos in the park.

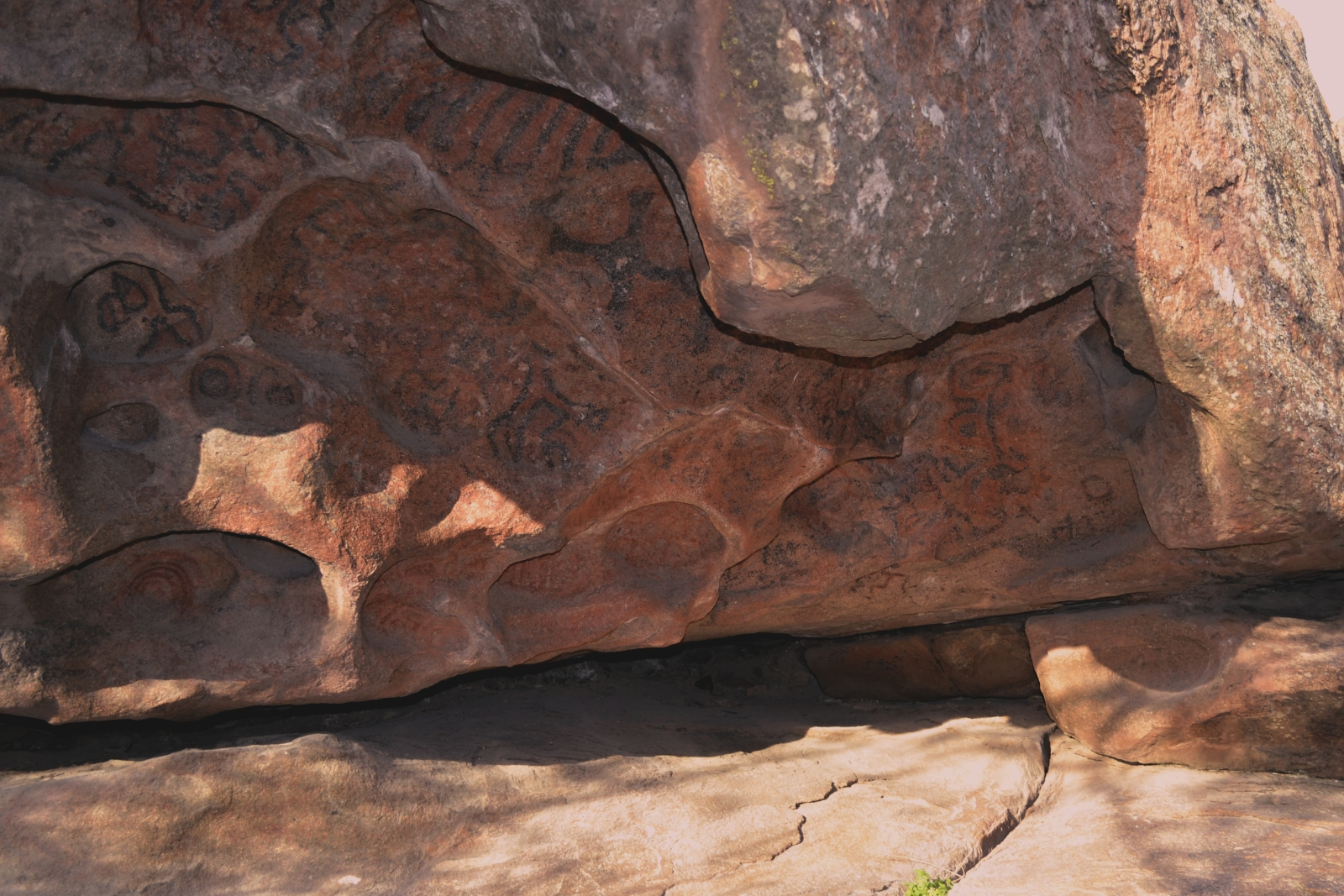
Rock art in the Las Pinturas Valley.
