= Bosques Petrificados de Jaramillo National Park =

National park in Argentina

Jaramillo Petrified Forest National Park
- Petrified Forest Natural Monument
- IUCN category II (national park)
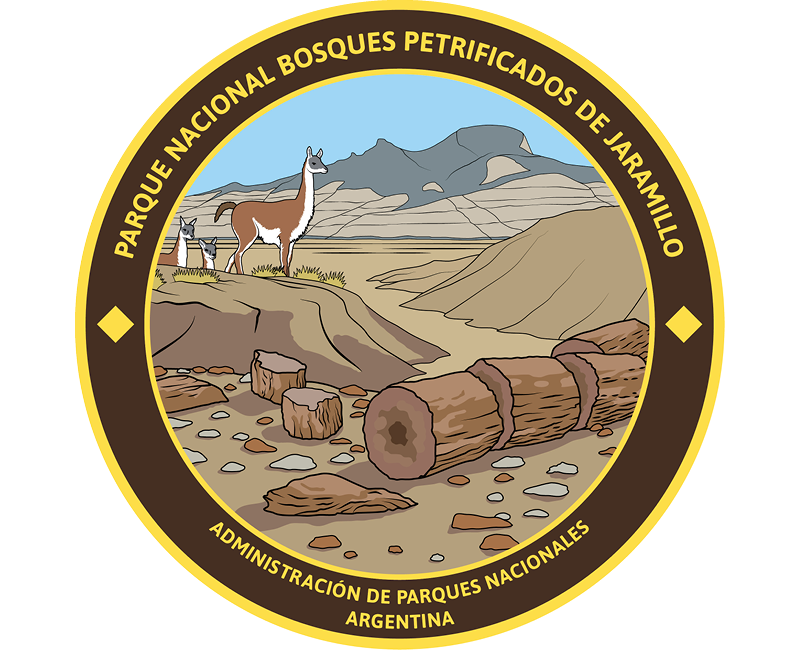
- Emblem of the Bosques Petrificados de Jaramillo National Park

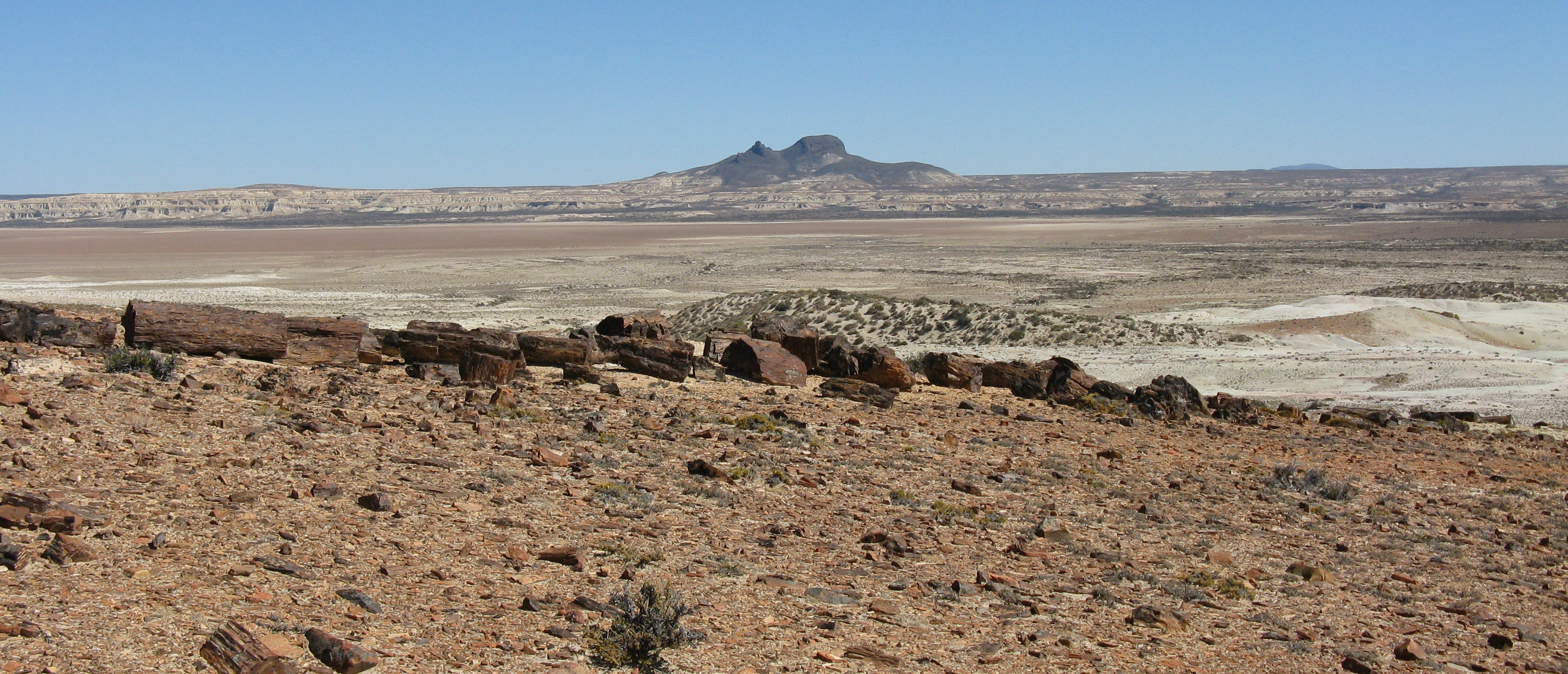
- Mother and Daughter Hills

- Location within Argentina
- Location: Deseado Department, Santa Cruz Province, Argentina
- Coordinates: 47.45°S 68.00°W
- Area: 78,543 ha (194,080 acres)
- Established: 2012

The Jaramillo Petrified Forest National Park is a protected area of petrified forest located in the Deseado Department, in the northeast of Santa Cruz Province, Argentina. Formerly part of the site was a natural monument, established in 1954 and known as the Petrified Forest Natural Monument, covering about 13,700 hectares (34,000 acres). This area has remnants of a forest preserved in stone, that had been growing on the site before the upthrust of the Andes some 150 million years ago. In December 2012, further land was added and the protected area was reclassified as a national park with a total area of 78,543 hectares (194,080 acres).

== The site ==
Until recently the site covered an area of 13,700 hectares (34,000 acres). However the National Parks Administration acquired two adjacent areas and included them in the protected area, forming a unit of 78,543 hectares (194,080 acres). The park is in the Patagonian steppe ecoregion where the climate is cool and dry in summer, and cold and fairly dry in winter, with less than 400 mm (16 in) precipitation and strong westerly winds. The fossilised trees were first discovered in 1925 and have been the subject of much research since. Many sections of trunk are preserved and lying on the surface of the ground, some being 2 m (7 ft) in diameter and others as long as 30 m (100 ft), and fossilized cones from the trees have also been found.

== History ==
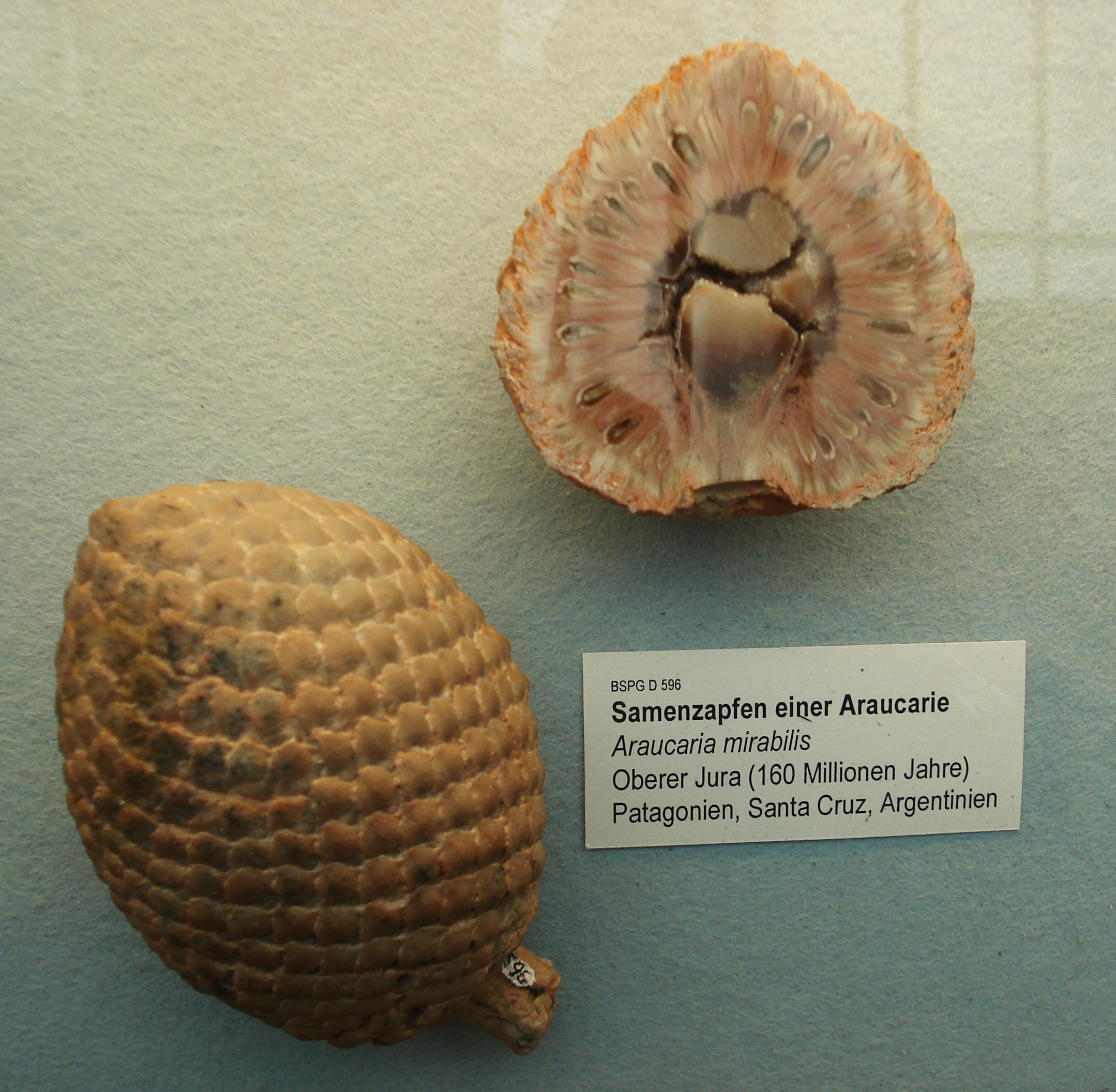
Fossilised cones of Araucaria mirabilis

About 150 million years ago, during the late Jurassic period, the area occupied by this national park had a stable climate with abundant moisture. Dense forests with giant trees grew here, among which were Araucaria mirabilis, an ancient relative of modern species of Araucaria, a kind of evergreen conifer.

This changed at the start of the Cretaceous period, when volcanic eruptions, which coincided with the start of upthrusting of the Andes mountains, buried some of the Patagonian territory in ash and lava. Part of the forests covered by ash were subjected to the processes of petrification. This process requires the fallen tree to be in an oxygen-free environment which preserves the original plant structure and general appearance, but which periodically gets inundated by mineral-rich water, replacing the organic structure with silica and other minerals. The end result is petrified wood.

Some of the fossilised trees were 100 m (328 ft) tall and 3.5 m (11 ft) in diameter. The site is of particular interest because it shows that the climate of this part of Patagonia was much wetter before the Andes intercepted the humid airflow from the west.

== Climate ==
The climate of the park is characterized as being cold, arid, and windy with large temperature swings between day and night. Mean temperatures range from 19 °C (66.2 °F) in summer to 7 °C (44.6 °F) in winter. Temperatures can reach up to 40 °C (104.0 °F) in summer while in winter, they can drop to −15 °C (5.0 °F). The park receives 200 mm (7.9 in) of rainfall per year, which is mostly concentrated in the summer months. Snowfall can occur during winter.

== Flora and fauna ==
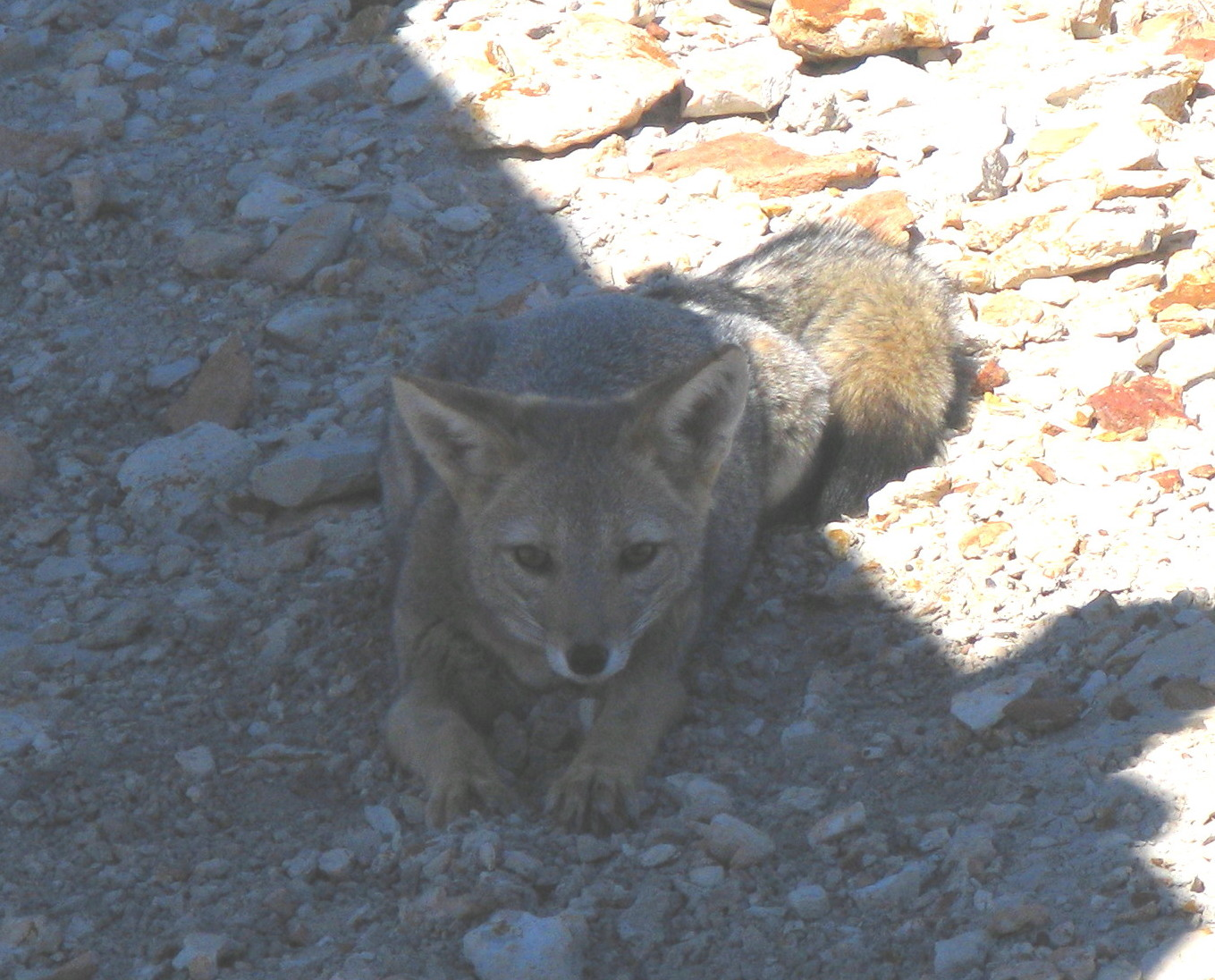
Culpeo (Lycalopex culpaeus).

The vegetation in the park is mostly low spiny shrubs adapted for living in arid environments; these include Caesalpinia gilliesii, Berberis microphylla, Arthrophyllum rigidum, Chiliotrichum diffusum, Mulinum spinosum and Fragaria chiloensis. The flightless lesser rhea is known from the park and mammals present include the guanaco, the dwarf armadillo, the culpeo fox and the South American gray fox.
