= José María Paz (footballer) =

Argentine footballer

Personal information
- Full name: José María Paz
- Date of birth: July 3, 1978 (age 48)
- Place of birth: Libertador General San Martín, Argentina
- Height: 1.84 m (6 ft 0 in)
- Position: Defender

Team information
- Current team: Macará

Senior career*
Years	Team	Apps	(Gls)
1996–1998	River Plate	7	(0)
1998	Gimnasia de Jujuy	6	(0)
1999–2000	Unión	30	(4)
2000–2001	River Plate	11	(0)
2001	Lanús	3	(0)
2002–2003	Blooming	45	(3)
2003	Huracán	15	(0)
2004	Blooming	16	(1)
2004–2006	Ben Hur	96	(3)
2007	Atlético Tucumán	7	(1)
2008	Ben Hur	17	(1)
2008–2009	Monagas	25	(1)
2010–	Macará	15	(0)
- * Club domestic league appearances and goals as of July 1, 2011

José María Paz (born July 3, 1978, in Libertador General San Martín, Jujuy) is an Argentine football defender who currently plays for Macará in the Ecuadorian Serie B.

In his native country he played for senior clubs such as River Plate, Gimnasia de Jujuy, Unión de Santa Fe, Lanús and Huracán. He also had two spells in the Liga de Fútbol Profesional Boliviano with Blooming.

Paz also played in the Argentine Primera B Nacional for Club Atlético Tucumán once, and Club Sportivo Ben Hur on two occasions. In 2008, he moved to Venezuela and signed for Monagas Sport Club from Venezuela. After two seasons, he transferred to Ecuadorian second division club Macará.

== Club titles ==
Season	Club	Title
1996 (A)	River Plate	Argentine Primera División
1997 (A)	River Plate	Argentine Primera División
