= Caimancito =

Coordinates: 23°44′S 64°35′W

- Municipality and town
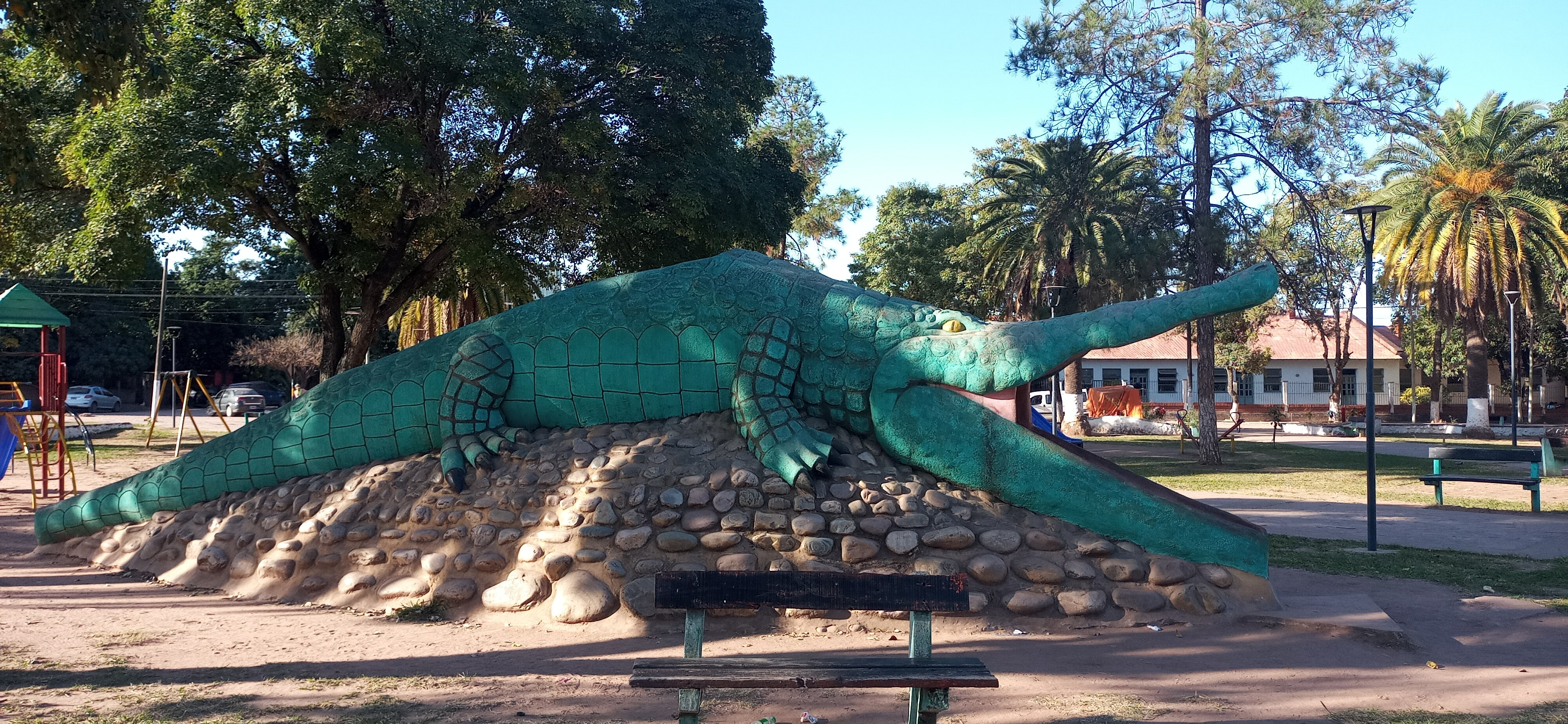
- Plaza Sarmiento, Caimancito, Argentina
- Interactive map of Caimancito
- Country: Argentina
- Province: Jujuy Province
- Time zone: UTC−3 (ART)

Caimancito is a town and municipality in Jujuy Province in Argentina.

== Climate ==
Climate data for Caimancito (1935–1990)
Month	Jan	Feb	Mar	Apr	May	Jun	Jul	Aug	Sep	Oct	Nov	Dec	Year
Daily mean °C (°F)	25.6 (78.1)	24.7 (76.5)	23.3 (73.9)	20.3 (68.5)	17.6 (63.7)	14.5 (58.1)	14.3 (57.7)	16.1 (61.0)	18.8 (65.8)	22.4 (72.3)	24.0 (75.2)	25.3 (77.5)	20.6 (69.1)
Average precipitation mm (inches)	186 (7.3)	183 (7.2)	153 (6.0)	83 (3.3)	16 (0.6)	8 (0.3)	4 (0.2)	5 (0.2)	5 (0.2)	32 (1.3)	85 (3.3)	136 (5.4)	896 (35.3)
Source: Instituto Nacional de Tecnología Agropecuaria
