= Islas de Santa Fe National Park =

National park in Argentina

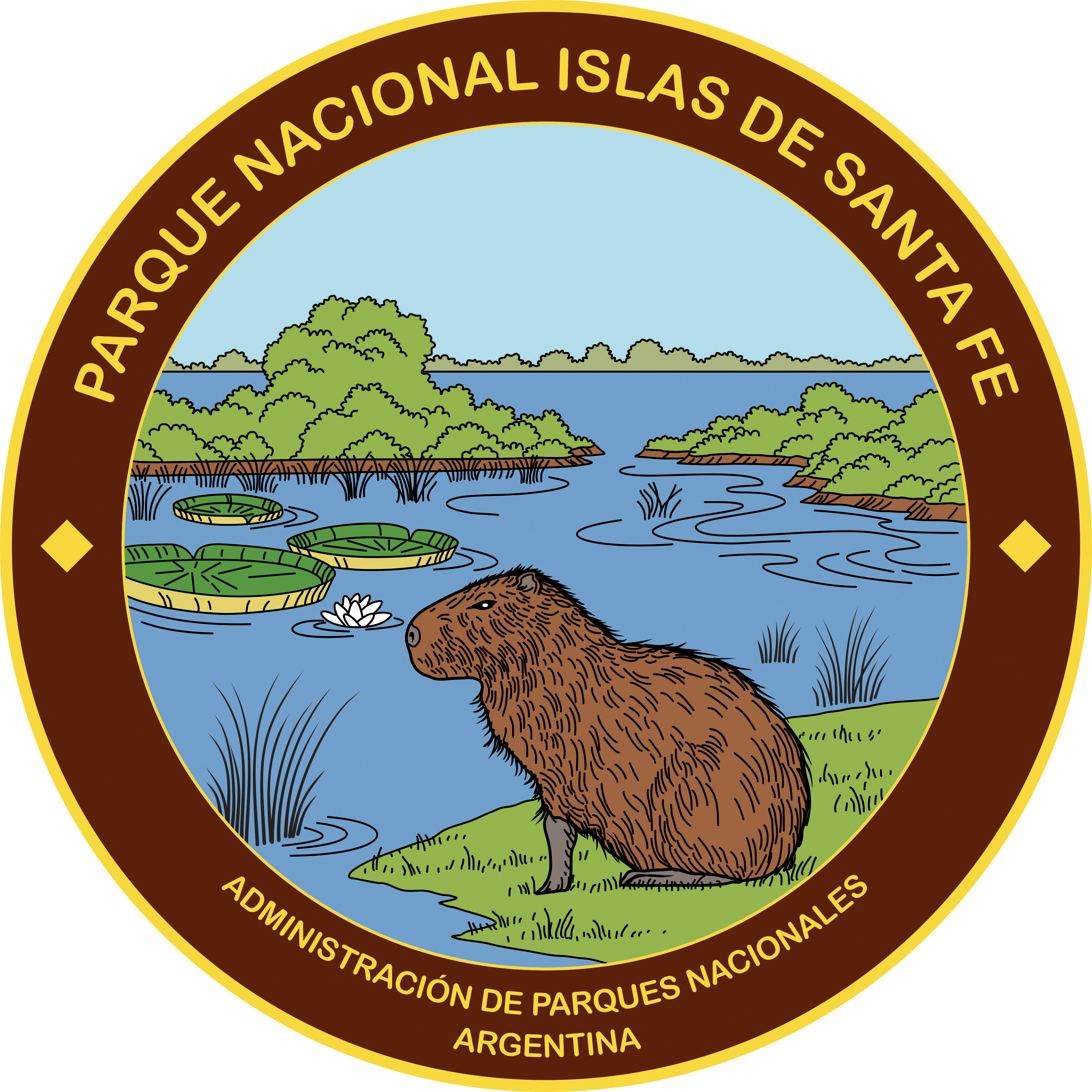
- Emblem of the Islas de Santa Fe National Park

- Location within Argentina
- Location: San Jerónimo Department, Santa Fe Argentina
- Coordinates: 32°04′S 60°48′W
- Established: 2010
- Governing body: Administración de Parques Nacionales

Islas de Santa Fe National Park (Spanish: Parque Nacional Islas de Santa Fe) is a national park of Argentina. It is situated in San Jerónimo Department, Santa Fe, Argentina.It was established in 2010.
