= Mburucuyá National Park =

National park in Argentina

- Parque Nacional Mburucuyá
- IUCN category II (national park)
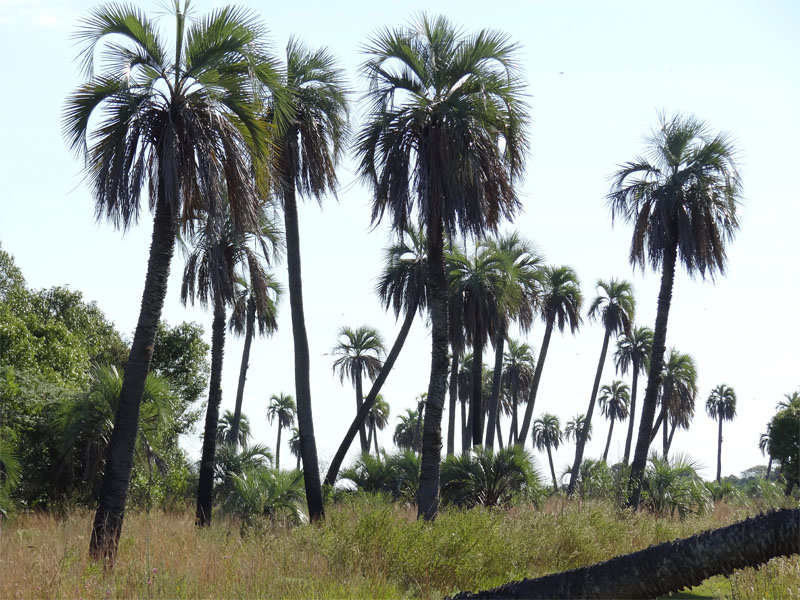
- Yatay palm trees of the park.

- Location within Argentina
- Location: Corrientes Province, Argentina
- Coordinates: 28°01′S 58°04′W
- Area: 17,660 ha (43,600 acres)
- Established: 2001; 25 years ago

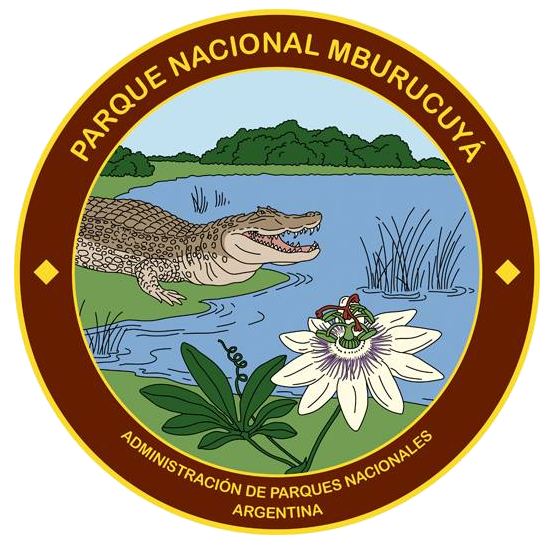
Logo of the park.

Mburucuyá National Park (Spanish: Parque Nacional Mburucuyá) is a national park in Argentina. It is located in the north west of the Corrientes Province around 150 km (93 mi) from the city of Corrientes and covers an area of 176 square kilometres (68 sq mi) of the Iberá Wetlands.

The area is important for the provision of water, the regulation of floods and droughts in the local region through its effects on the regional microclimate.

== History ==
Around 5,000 years ago the area was populated by indigenous peoples, in more recent times the area was occupied by the Guaraní who introduced the cultivation of maize, squash, beans, Cassava, cotton and yerba mate.

When the territory was colonized by the Spanish many of the original settlements were occupied and substantially modified. The introduction of large scale agriculture saw the indiscriminate deforestation of native trees.

The creation of the national park occurred in the 20th century. After the Second World War Dr. Troels Pederson donated the territory for the creation of the national park. The objectives of the park are to maintain the environment and show the region in its historical context.

== Plant communities ==
The park is divided between three distinct plant communities – chaqueña, espinal, and selva paranaense.

=== Chaco Oriental ===
The Chaco Oriental or Humid Chaco is composed of woodland, palms, grass plains and wetlands. Some characteristic native species are quebracho colorado (Schinopsis lorentzii) and quebraco blanco (Aspidosperma quebracho-blanco), urunday (Myracrodruon balansae), and viraró (Ruprechtia laxiflora), Prosopis, and caranday palm (Copernicia alba).

=== Selva Paranaense ===
The Selva Paranaense is characterised by small hills, local species include the palms Syagrus romanzoffiana and timbó (Enterolobium contortisiliquum), and laurel.

=== El Espinal ===
The Espinal is populated with yatay palms, grassland, and diverse xerophile woodland.

== Fauna ==
The park has around 150 species of birds, and many species of animal including capybara, caiman, foxes, armadillos, jaguars, and brown howler monkeys. Endangered species include maned wolf, neotropical river otter, and marsh deer.

Native fish species include golden dorado and pseudoplatystoma.
