= Baritú National Park =

- IUCN category II (national park)
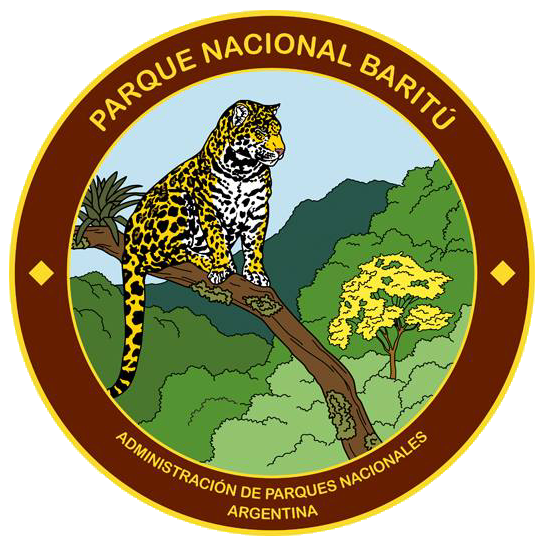
- Emblem of the Baritú National Park

- Location within Argentina
- Location: Salta Province, Argentina
- Coordinates: 22°34′S 64°48′W
- Area: 720 km^{2} (280 sq mi)
- Established: 1974
- Governing body: Administración de Parques Nacionales

The Baritú National Park (Spanish: Parque Nacional Baritú) is a national park in Argentina, located in Santa Victoria Department, in the north of Salta Province, in the Argentine Northwest. The park borders Bolivia (Tarija Department), and its only road access is through that country. It has an area of 720 square kilometres (72,000 ha) and it is the only tropical park in Argentina.

The park was created in 1974. It is bordered by mountains. The protected area belongs to the Southern Andean Yungas ecoregion, which is located in the Sub-Andean mountain range, with heights averaging 1,500–2,500 m (4,900–8,200 ft). The climate is wet and hot, with summer rainfall that goes from 900–1,300 mm (35–51 in).

The fauna of the park includes several endangered species, such as the jaguar and the ocelot.

The cedro salteño trees (Salta cedrelas) reach large sizes in this region. Their wood is considered extremely valuable.

== Gallery ==
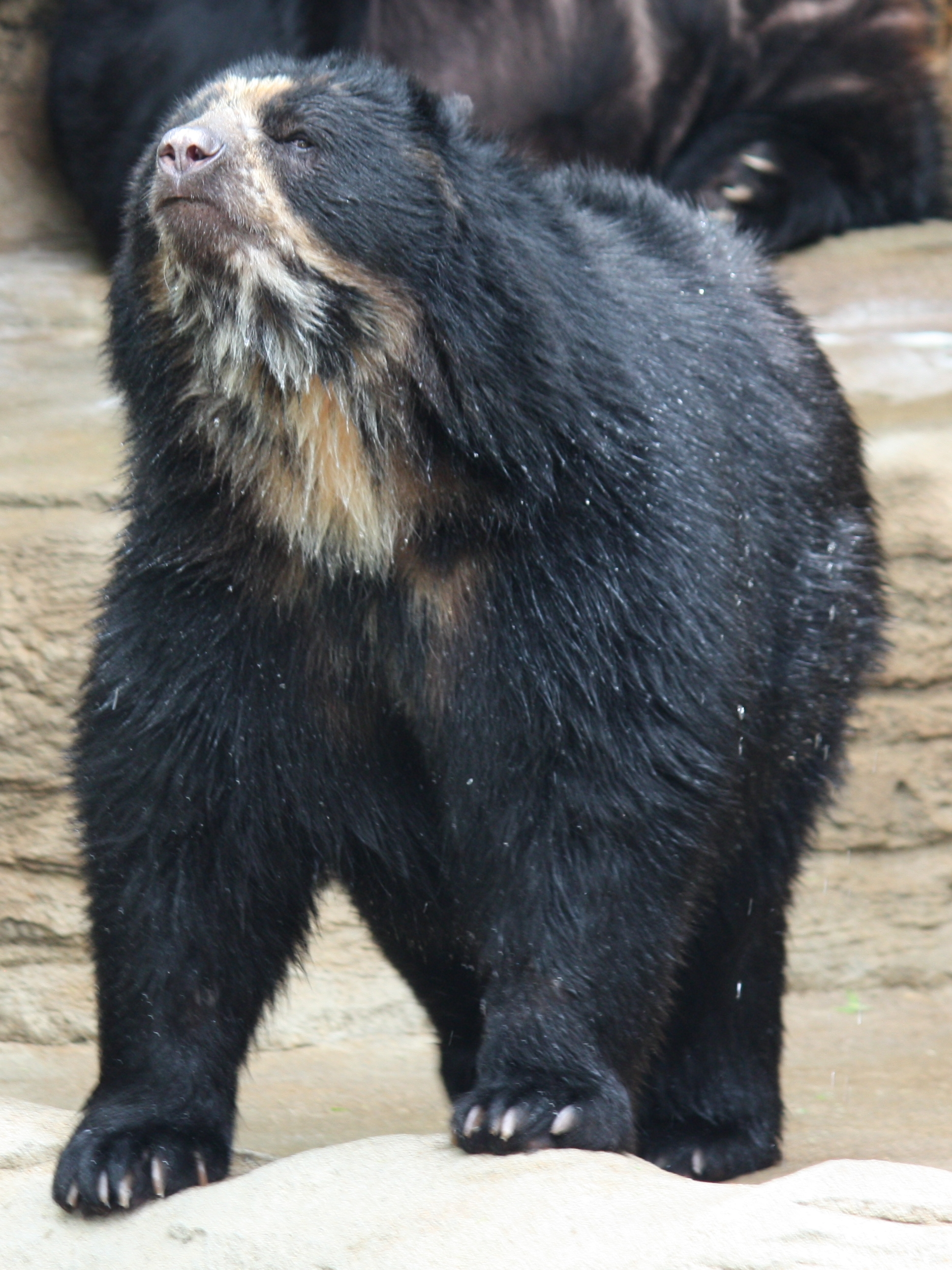
Spectacled bear

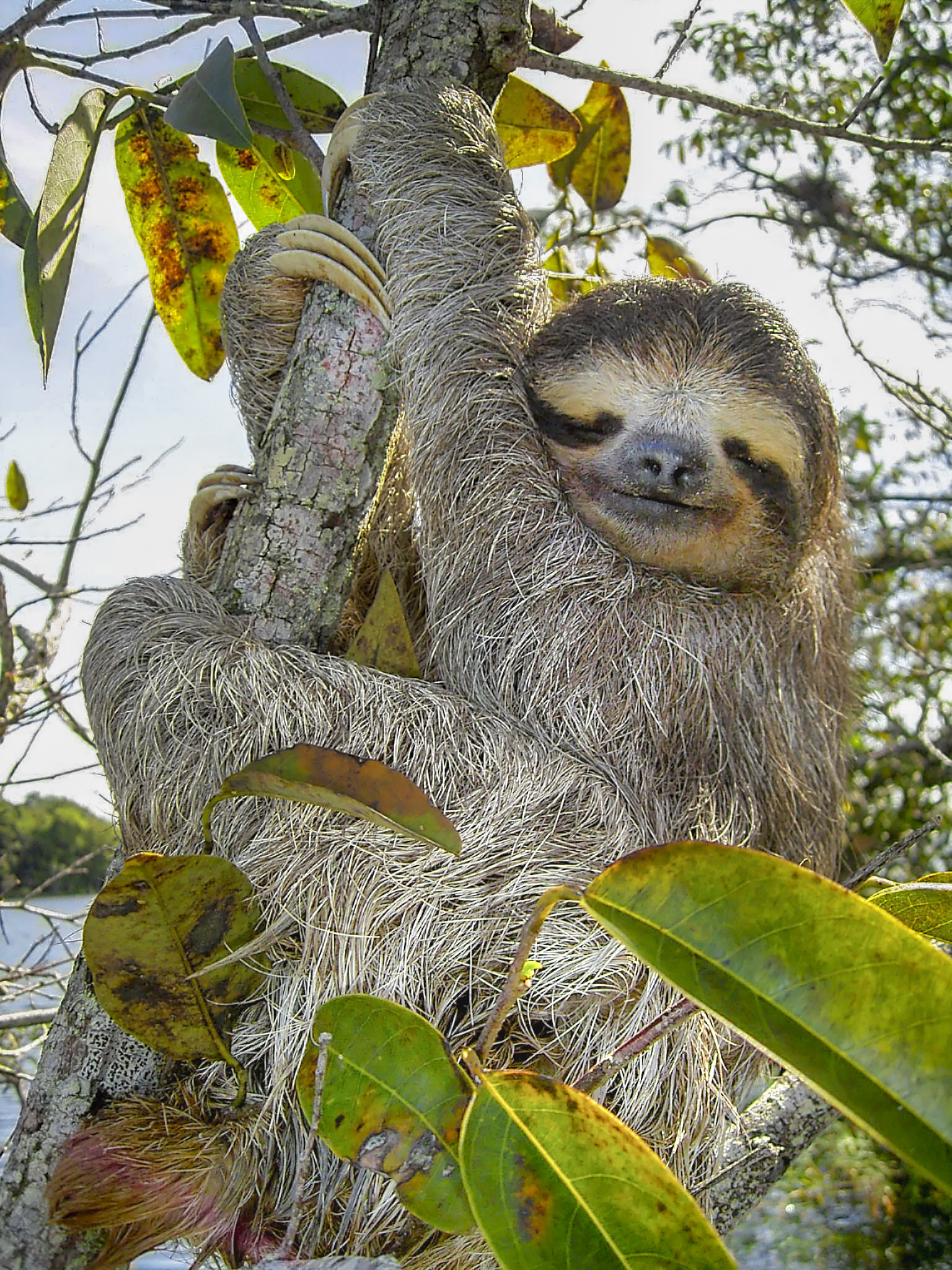
Bradypus

Standing jaguar

== See also ==
- South America

== Sources ==
- Administración de Parques Nacionales - National Parks Administration of Argentina (in Spanish and English)
