= Southern Andean Yungas =

Ecoregion in Argentina and Bolivia

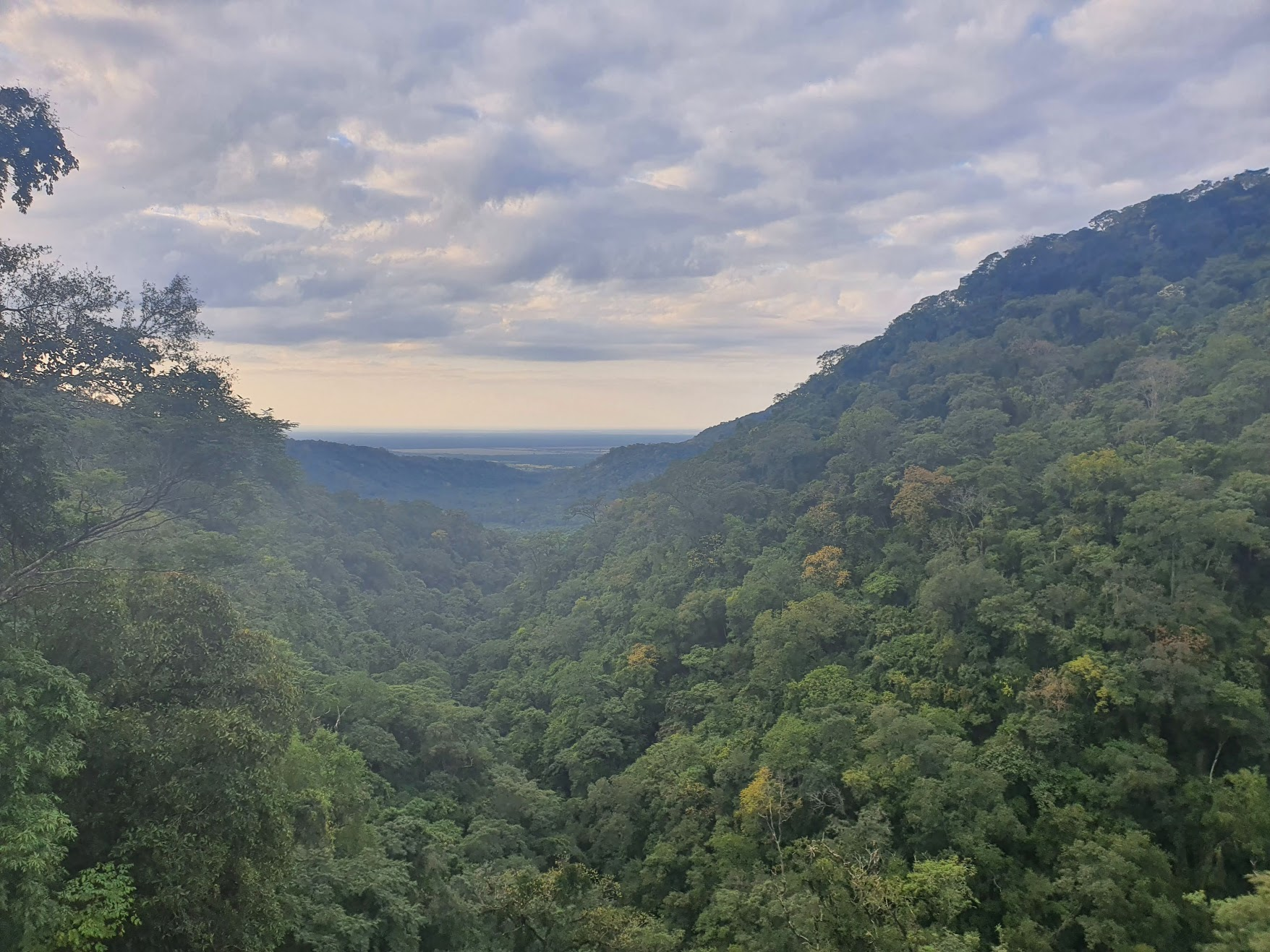
- Aerial view of the Acambuco Provincial Reserve in Salta, Argentina

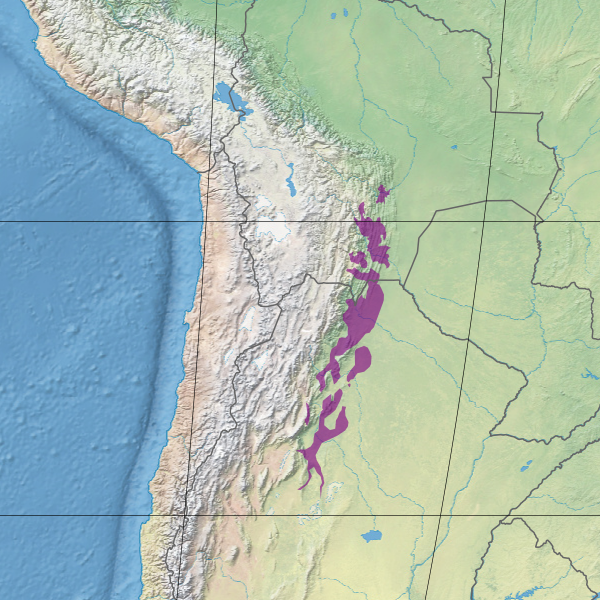
- Ecoregion territory (in purple)

Ecology
- Realm: Neotropical
- Biome: Tropical and subtropical moist broadleaf forest
- Borders: List: Dry Chaco; Bolivian montane dry forests; Central Andean puna; High Monte; Córdoba montane savanna

Geography
- Area: 61,100 km^{2} (23,600 sq mi)
- Countries: Argentina; Bolivia

Conservation
- Protected: 12.87%

The Southern Andean Yungas is a tropical and subtropical moist broadleaf forest ecoregion in the Yungas of southwestern Bolivia and northwestern Argentina.

== Geography ==
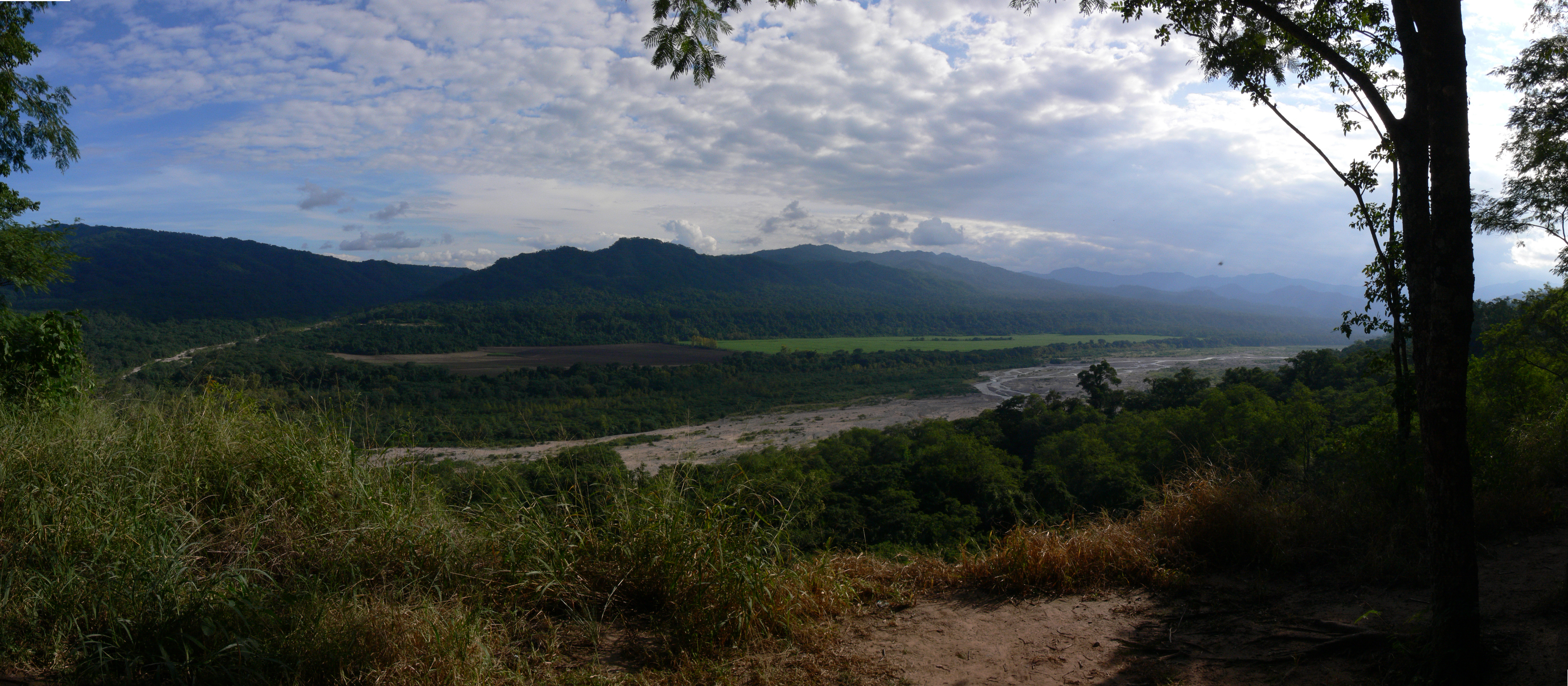
Panorama of San Lorenzo River in Calilegua National Park.

The ecoregion occurs along the eastern slope of the Andes from southern Bolivia into northern Argentina, at elevations ranging from 800 to 3,000 metres (2,600 to 9,800 ft). In the lowlands to the east the Yungas transition to the semi-arid Dry Chaco. To the northwest they are bounded by the Bolivian montane dry forests, and by the high-elevation Central Andean puna and High Monte grasslands to the west.

== Climate ==
This ecoregion has a subtropical highland climate. The climate is influenced by trade winds from the east that bring up to 2,500 millimetres (98 in) of rain per year. There is a dry season from April to October, and occasional snowfall at higher elevations during the winter months.

Rainfall and temperature varies with elevation. In the foothill forests (400 to 900 meters elevation) average annual rainfall ranges from 550 to 1400 mm, with a mean of 820 mm. Mean annual temperature is 21.5 °C, with a mean maximum of 27.6 °C, and a mean minimum of 15.4 °C. In the montane forest belt between 900 and 1600 meters elevation, rainfall averages 1,100 to 2,300 mm annually, with a mean of 1,800 mm. Average annual rainfall in the upper montane forests, between 1,600 and 2,300 meters elevation, ranges from 800 to 1,400 mm, with a mean of 1100 mm. The montane forest and upper montane forest are cloud forests, where mist and cloud cover can contribute up to 100% additional vertical precipitation. Mean temperature in the montane and upper montane belts is 11.7 °C, with a mean maximum of 21.8◦C and a mean minimum of 8.8◦C.

== Flora ==
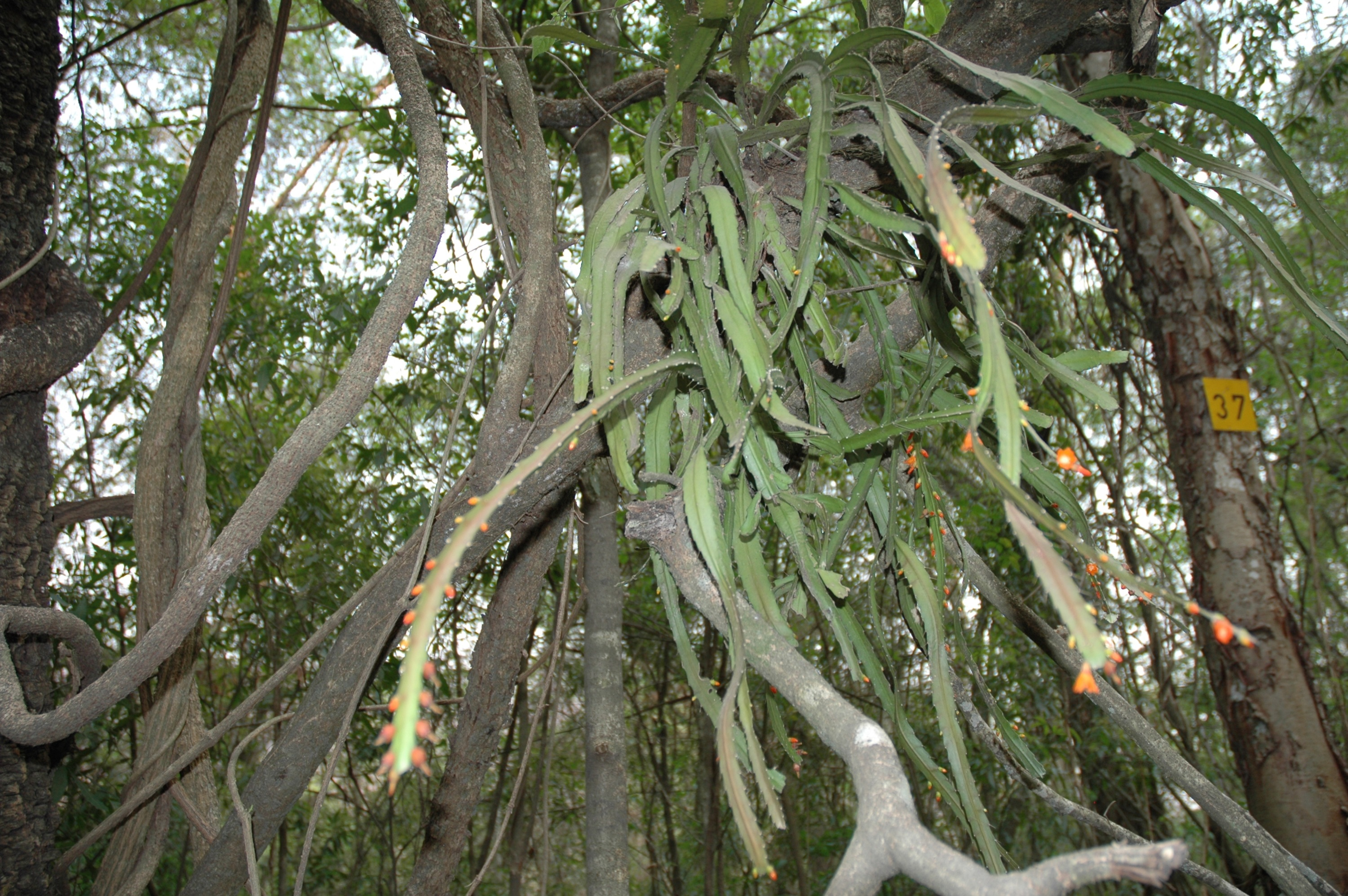
Lepismium monacanthum in Calilegua National Park.

The Southern Andean Yungas consists of a mesic evergreen forest, with trees typically less than 15 metres (49 ft) tall.

The species composition of the forests varies with elevation and precipitation. The foothill forests are a transition between the Yungas and the semi-arid Dry Chaco of the lowlands. Trees are predominantly of the bean family (Leguminosae), and of tropical origin. Many trees are dry-season deciduous, particularly below 700 meters elevation.

Montane forests (selva montaña) occur between 900 and 1600 meters elevation. Trees from families Leguminosae, Sapindaceae, Lauraceae, and Euphorbiaceae are prominent, along with species of Cordia from family Boraginaceae. Most are from families and genera of tropical origin. Allophylus edulis, Parapiptadenia excelsa, Blepharocalyx salicifolius, and Ocotea porphyria are present at all elevations, and are of greatest ecological importance between 1,300 and 1,500 meters elevation. Myrtle forests occur between 1000 and 1400 meters elevation, dominated by trees from the myrtle family (Myrtaceae). In the myrtle forests the co-dominant trees are güili colorado (Amomyrtella guilii), which is endemic to the ecoregion, and güili blanco (Myrcianthes pseudomato).

Between 1500 and 1600 meters elevation there is a transition zone between the montane and upper montane forests. Upper montane forests (Bosque deciduo or bosque montaño) extend from 1,600 to 2,500 metres (5,200 to 8,200 ft). They are dominated by Andean alder (Alnus acuminata), the conifer Podocarpus parlatorei, and queñoa (Polylepis australis), along with Viburnum seemenii, Sambucus peruviana, Ilex argentina, and Juglans australis, and species of Eupatorium and Kaunia. Many trees are deciduous, and of Holarctic or Antarctic–Gondwanan origin.

Above 2600 meters elevation, the forests transition to subalpine grassland and shrubland (pastizal de neblina), of the Central Andean puna ecoregion.

== Fauna ==
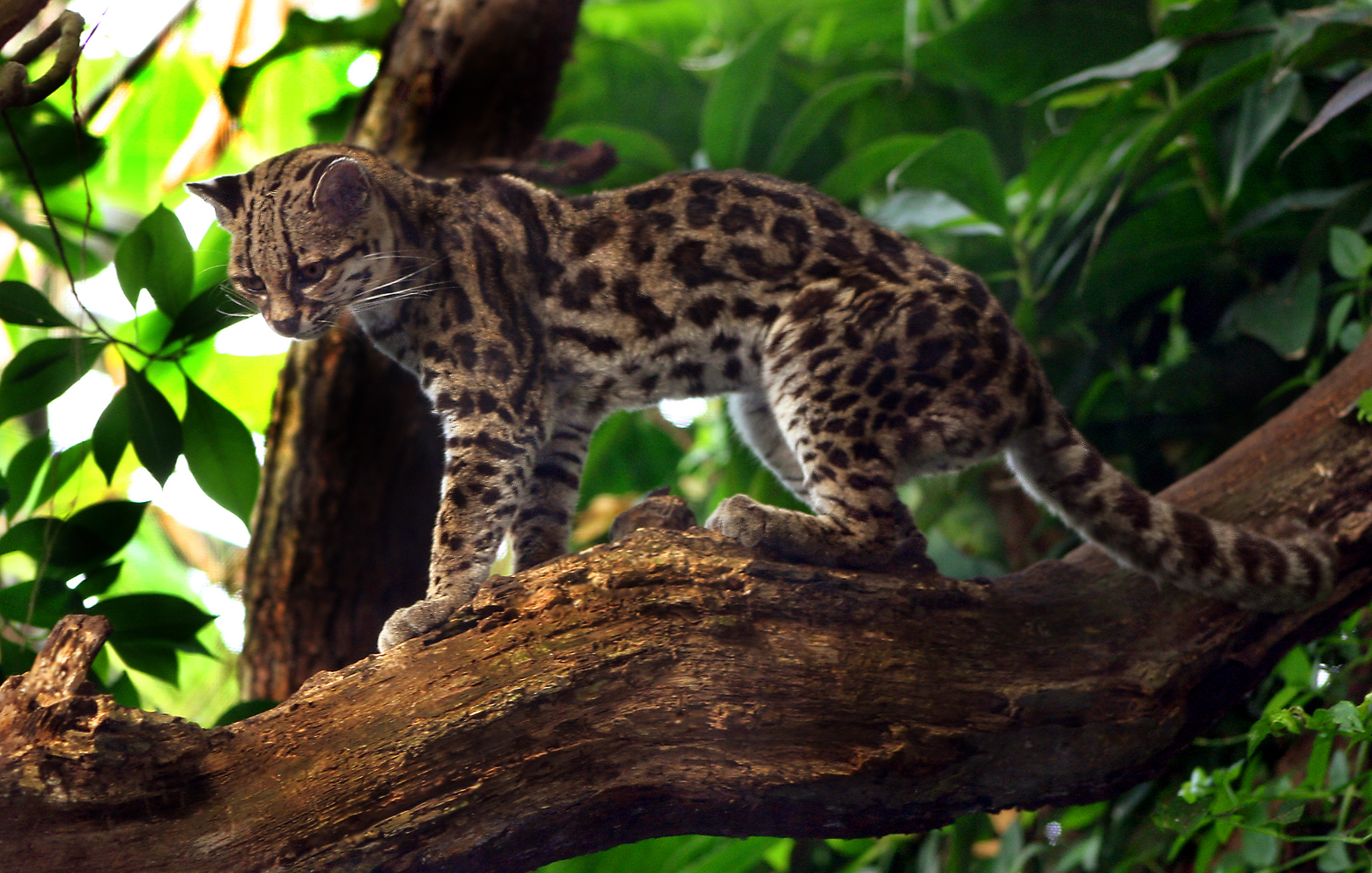
A Margay in the forest.

Many tropical species find the southern limit of their range in this ecoregion.

Mammals that may be found here include the red brocket (Mazama americana), gray brocket (Mazama gouazoupira), white-lipped peccary (Tayassu pecari), collared peccary (Dicotyles tajacu), and South American tapir (Tapirus terrestris). Cats include the jaguar (Panthera onca), puma (Puma concolor), margay (Leopardus wiedii), and jaguarundi (Herpailurus yagouaroundi). Other carnivores include the crab-eating fox (Cerdocyon thous) and tayra (Eira barbara). The Pampas fox (Lycalopex gymnocercus) is found in foothill forests in the transition to the Chaco.

Characteristic birds of the ecoregion include the Andean condor (Vultur gryphus), barred forest falcon (Micrastur ruficollis), band-tailed pigeon (Patagioenas fasciata), blue-capped puffleg (Eriocnemis glaucopoides), Azara's spinetail (Synallaxis azarae), yellow-striped brushfinch (Atlapetes citrinellus), golden-crowned warbler (Basileuterus culicivorus), two-banded warbler (Myiothlypis bivittata), and Andean slaty thrush (Turdus nigriceps). Birds endemic to this ecoregion include the red-faced guan (Penelope dabbenei), Tucumán amazon (Amazona tucumana), Rothschild's swift (Cypseloides rothschildi), and the rufous-throated dipper (Cinclus schulzi).

Swainson's thrush (Catharus ustulatus) is a seasonal migrant.

Native amphibians include the toads Rhinella arenarum and Rhinella spinulosa. The endangered La Banderita marsupial frog (Gastrotheca gracilis) inhabits the Southern Andean Yungas and adjacent Central Andean puna. The critically endangered frog Telmatobius ceiorum is endemic to the Yungas of the Sierra del Aconquija.

== Protected areas ==
12.87% of the ecoregion is in protected areas. Protected areas include:

- Acambuco Flora and Fauna Reserve
- Aconquija National Park (Campo de los Alisos National Park)
- Amboró National Park
- Aguaragüe National Park and Integrated Management Natural Area
- Baritú National Park
- Calilegua National Park
- Carabajal Wildlife Reserve
- El Rey National Park
- La Angostura Strict Nature Reserve
- Los Sosa Nature Reserve
- Quebrada de Humahuaca Protected Landscape
- Quebrada del Portugués Nature Reserve
- Santa Ana Nature Reserve
- Tariquía Flora and Fauna National Reserve
