= Sierras Pampeanas =

Mountain in Argentina

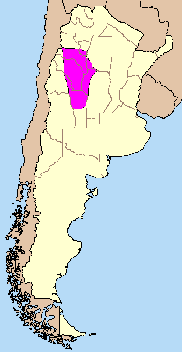
Location of the region

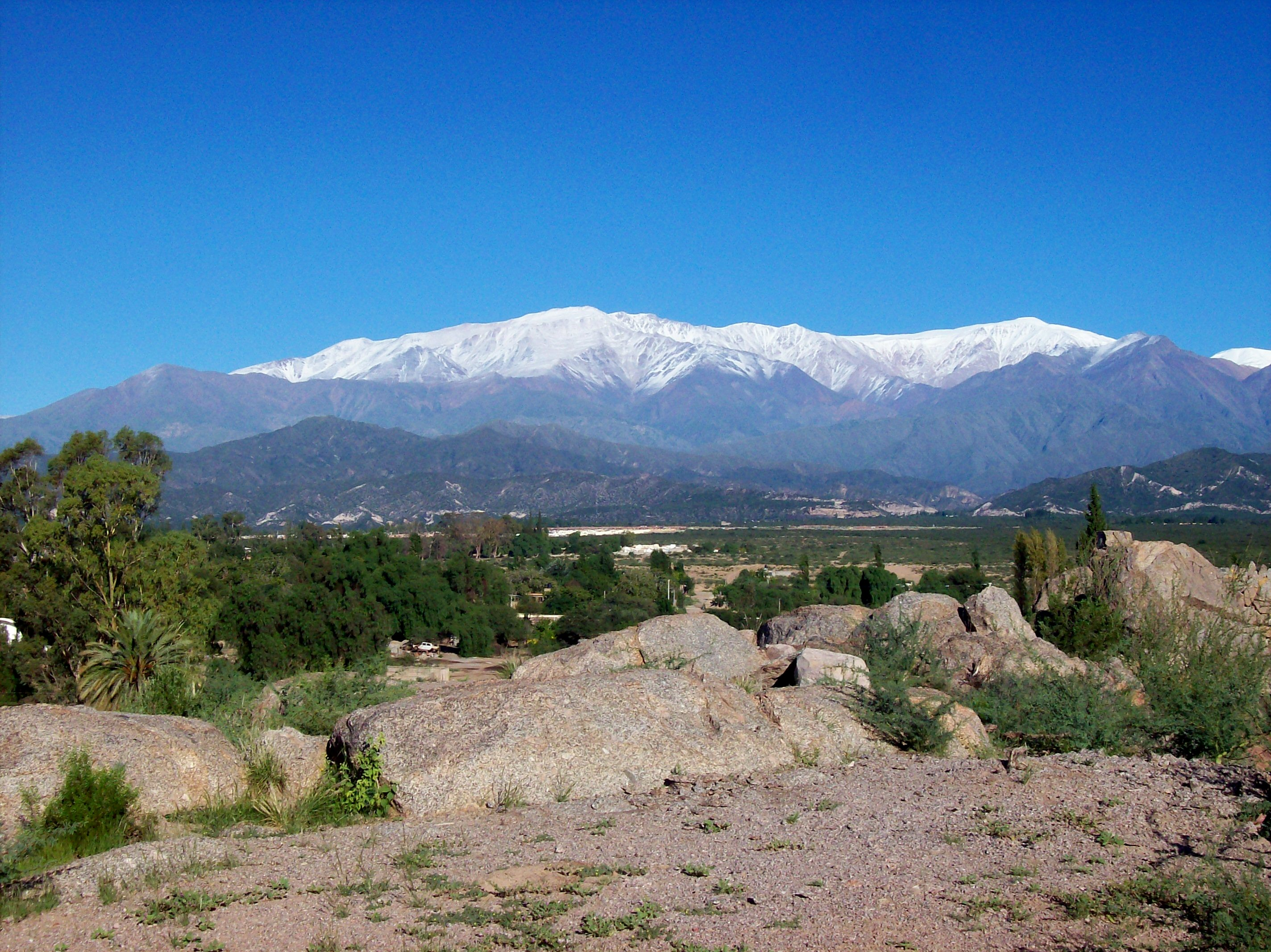
Cerro General Belgrano

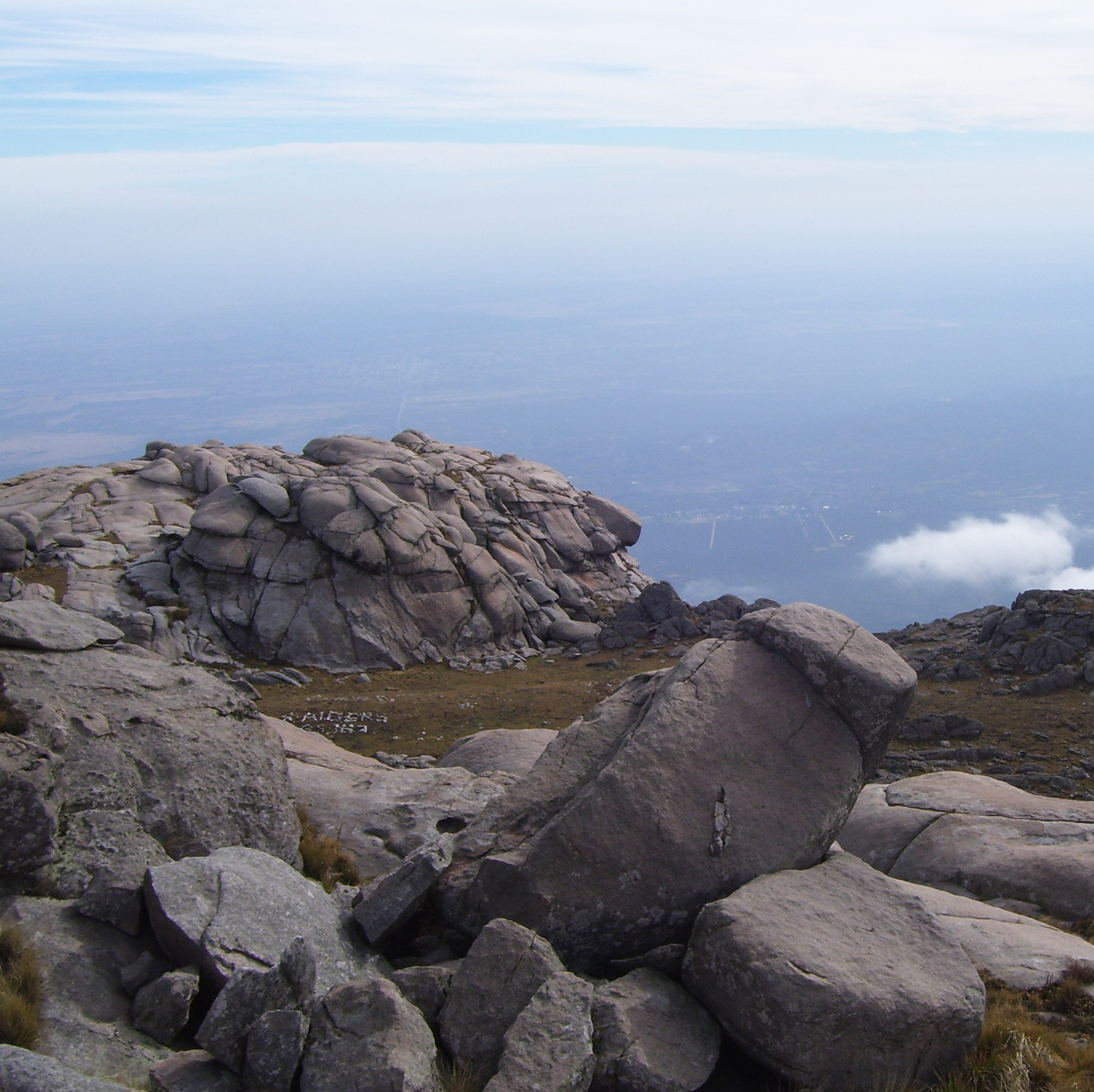
West side of Champaquí after a snowfall

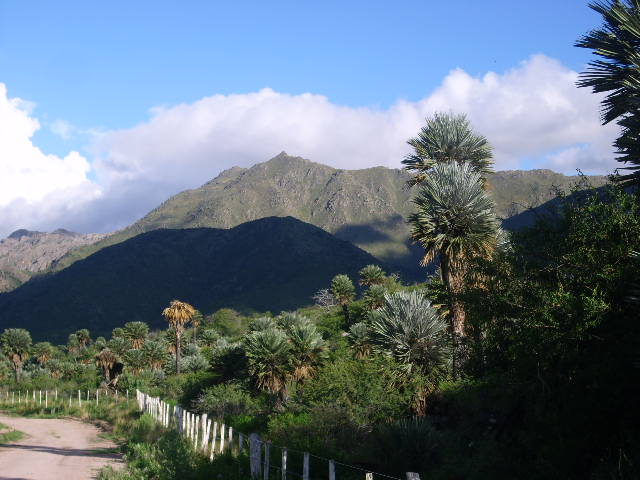
Trithrinax campestris forests near Papagayos

The Sierras Pampeanas (also called Central Sierras or Pampas Sierras) (English: Pampas Mountains) is a geographical region of Argentina.

The Sierras Pampeanas are a chain of mountains that rise sharply from the surrounding pampa region of Northwest Argentina. They run parallel to the Andes Mountains and their crest line is some 540 km (340 mi) east of the Andes crest line (running from 29° to 35° S latitude at about 65° W longitude). They cross into seven Argentina provinces: San Luis, San Juan, Córdoba, La Rioja, Catamarca, Santiago del Estero and Tucumán.

== Geography ==
Argentine authorities consider the highest point of the Sierras Pampeanas is Cerro General Belgrano (6250 m above sea level) in La Rioja, in the Sierra de Famatina, but it is controversial (probably it is an Andean mountain, not Pampean). Between the mountain ranges are several salt-filled depressions. The Salinas Grandes depression is located in Cordoba, La Rioja, Catamarca and Santiago del Estero. A characteristic of many of these mountain ranges is their morphological asymmetry: the western slopes are usually steeper than the eastern slopes, thus the former are sometimes called coasts and the latter are called skirts. The narrow valleys are called "broken" or "open"; the narrow openings between valleys are called "doors".

Due to erosion and other geologic forces (volcanoes, glaciers, rivers, tectonic etc.), the surface of this area varies widely. It includes cliffs and narrow channels of some rivers which are named "drawers" (if they are of moderate size) or "guns "(if they are older); there are abundant caves, grottos and overhangs. Some mountains are separated by significant open areas (too large to be considered a "valley"); these are called "barreales" (mud-flats) or "pampas" (grassy plains).

=== Sub-ranges ===
The Sierras Pampeanas are composed of several sub-ranges:

- Tucumán and Catamarca: Cumbres Calcahaquíes, Sierra del Aconquija;
- Catamarca: Sierra de Belén, Sierra de Ambato, Sierra de Ancasti (or Sierra del Alto), Sierra de Fiambalá, Sierra de Hualfín;
- La Rioja: Sierra de Famatina, Sierra de Sañogasta, Sierra de Velasco, Sierra de los Llanos, Sierra de los Colorados, Sierra de las Minas, Sierra de Chepes, Sierra de Paganzo;
- San Juan: Sierra de Valle Fértil, Sierra de la Huerta, Sierra Guayaguas, Sierra de Pie de Palo;
- Santiago del Estero: Sierra de Ambargasta, Sierra de Guasayán, Sierra de Sumampa;
- San Luis: Sierra de las Quijadas, Sierra de Varela, Sierra del Portezuelo, Sierra del Alto Pencoso, Sierra del Yulto, Sierra de Falcón, Sierra de Guayaguas, Sierra de Cantantal, Sierra del Tala;
- Córdoba: Sierras de Córdoba, including Sierras de Comechingones (which border with San Luis).

The name "Pampean Ranges" can be misleading, since the Argentine Pampas cover most of the country's northern and eastern portion. However, other mountains which rise from these expanses are considered distinct geologic formations, not part of the Sierras Pampeanas.

== Geology ==
Before the Mesozoic the Sierras Pampeanas was affected by cycles of orogenic events produced by a series continent-continent collisions along the Proto-Pacific margin of Gondwana. The Neoproterozoic–Cambrian Pampean orogeny was a major event along south-western Gondwana that coincided with the end of the Brasiliano–Pan-African orogenies. In the Cambrian, subduction along the Proto-Pacific margin lead to the Famatinian orogeny which accreted the Precordillera Terrane to Gondwana. In the Gondwanide orogeny, Gondwana reached its maximum extent in the Early Carboniferous and began to break-up in the Early Cretaceous. Along the Pacific margin the convergence of tectonic plates lead to renewed subduction which produced the large rhyolitic provinces and plutonic belts of the Permian–Jurassic.

Between 530 and 440 million years ago, during the Pampean and Famatinian orogenies the area of the Sierras Pampeanas was intruded by a series of pegmatite dykes. Later, around 370 million years ago a smaller event of pegmatite intrusion took place. Today these dykes are collectively known as the Pampean Pegmatite Province. These pegmatites host valuable lithium reserves.

By the end of the Paleozoic erosion had led to the formation of a peneplain in the eastern Sierras Pampeanas. Later tectonic movements split this surface into various levels with the highest level being Pampa de Achala.

As the South Atlantic opened following the Paraná-Etendeka flood basalts, the Andean orogeny began the formation of the Andes, the product of volcanism and compressional forces along the Pacific margin, but also resulted in the development of extensional basins in South America and a passive margin along the Atlantic coast, processes still going on today. The basement of the Sierras Pampeanas was uplifted during the Andean orogeny over a near-horizontal segment of the subducting Nazca Plate. Sierras Pampeanas was also affected by Miocene arc magmatism 700 km (430 mi) east of the Chile Trench during this period.

== Climate and hydrography ==
This region has a temperate and semi-arid climate, with warm summers and cool winters. The northern east slope is covered by rainforest, due to high humidity in this subtropical zone. The portions within Córdoba and San Luis enjoy Mediterranean-type climate, with intense summer rainstorms and snowy winters; the vegetation here includes conifer trees. More precipitation falls on the eastern slopes, which meet the moist winds from the Atlantic Ocean.

Groundwater is not abundant in most of this area; the eastern slopes show greater population due to the greater runoff water available there. There are short, torrential rivers and many streams and rivulets that carry low flows, with brief and violent floods caused by summer rains. These rivers are used for the production of hydropower.

== Flora and fauna ==
The flora and fauna of the Sierras Pampeanas varies with elevation and exposure. The Dry Chaco, a region of dry forests, shrublands, and savannas, lies in the lowlands and foothills to the east. The east-facing slopes of the sierras intercept moisture-bearing winds, and are more humid than the adjacent lowlands. These higher-rainfall slopes are home to the Southern Andean Yungas humid forests. The western slopes are in the more arid rain shadow of the ranges. The High Monte shrublands are found in the western slopes and intermountain valleys and basins west of the Sierras. High-elevation Central Andean Puna grasslands occur along the ridgeline of the Sierra de Aconquija.

=== Flora ===
Extant species include algarrobo blanco (white carob), algarrobo negro, chañar, jarilla, mistol, piquillin, tala, alpataco, tabaquillo and espinillo.

In the more arid regions (the west faces) grow giant or medium cactus and various shrubs (chilca, tola, etc.)

The Southern Andean Yungas are humid forests found on east-facing slopes with higher rainfall. Trees of the Yungas include Andean alder (Alnus acuminata), the conifer Podocarpus parlatorei, and deciduous trees including walnut (Juglans australis), jacaranda, Pisonia, Schinus molle, quebracho, acacia, and flowering plants such as orchids, jasmine and bromeliads.

The Sierras de Córdoba in Córdoba and San Luis provinces have abundant vegetation on the eastern slopes, including carob, "coconuts" (local name of palm trees), garabato blanco (acacia) and willow.

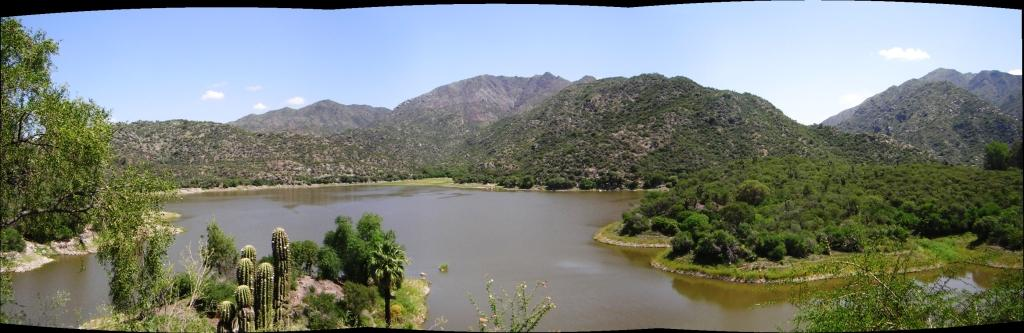
The mountains of Fertile Valley in San Juan

Much of the area is deforested due to desertification, logging ("clearing"), strip-mining (without resurfacing or replanting), animal overgrazing, and burning to open up areas for grazing.

=== Fauna ===
The area boasts a diverse fauna, although several species are moving toward extinction (such as the boa). Among the native animals: puma, brocket deer (in the north), wildcat, fox, armadillo and mule deer; rodents such as the viscacha and guinea pig.

The observed fauna varies according to the combination of three basic natural factors: the arrangement of mountain ranges, altitude and climate. There are important variances of biome in the Pampas Sierras: semi-arid areas, rain-forest areas, and moderately fertile areas covered with natural forests (especially in Córdoba and San Luis). In the arid zone of La Rioja and Catamarca are found vicuña and some alpaca. Earlier in the twentieth century jaguar were found in the rainforests. In the eighteenth century there were sightings of spectacled bears.

The avifauna is diverse and relatively abundant in the higher, mostly arid areas. It includes Andean condors and vultures. In the fertile plains of Tucumán Province previously were found rhea, turkey, parrot, hummingbird, woodpecker and pigeons.

Settlers to the region have introduced domestic animals such as horses, donkeys, goats, pigs, cattle and sheep.

== Economy ==
Agriculture is the predominant economic activity in the area. Certain areas are noted for wine and olive oil production, as well as cheeses, homemade breads, pies, sweets (the best known nationally are the sweet potato and quince) and alcohol. Most products are for local consumption. Only where rainfall is more abundant is agricultural output destined for outside sale.

Tree crops are grown in the foothills of the Sierras de Córdoba, including olives, peach, pear, apricot, fig trees, quince, lemon trees, and plantations of cypress, cedar, ponderosa pine, eucalyptus, poplar, oak, and willow which are grown for timber and forest products. Shrubs and medicinal herbs grown in the Sierras de Córdoba include peperina, pennyroyal, dandelion, plantain, canchalagua, wild grapes, chamomile, malva, lime and passion fruit.

In arid areas such as the center and west of La Rioja and Catamarca, irrigated vines thrive, and large plantations of olive trees, (jujube was brought by Lebanese immigrants and Syrians in early twentieth century), grains, aloe and jojoba.

Most of these products are sold within the region, mainly associated with tourism. Due to its climate and spectacular scenery the Sierras Pampeanas are a major tourist destination in Argentina.

Salt mining is an important industry; the salt beds there are the country's largest, covering some 8400 km^{2}.
