= Abrothrix illuteus =

Conservation status
- Least Concern (IUCN 3.1)

Scientific classification
- Kingdom: Animalia
- Phylum: Chordata
- Class: Mammalia
- Order: Rodentia
- Family: Cricetidae
- Subfamily: Sigmodontinae
- Genus: Abrothrix
- Species: A. illuteus

Binomial name
- Abrothrix illuteus Thomas, 1925

Synonyms
- Akodon illuteus

Species of rodent

Abrothrix illuteus, also known as the gray akodont, gray grass mouse, or gray soft-haired mouse, is a species of small rodent in the genus Abrothrix of family Cricetidae. It is found only in northwestern Argentina.

== Description ==
The dorsal surface of Abrothrix illuteus is a uniform olive-gray in colour with tufts of white hairs on the chin and white bases to the hairs in the inguinal area. The ventral surface is ashy-gray. The hair is soft and long and the short tail is well-covered with hair. The feet are large, have claws of the same size on fore and hind feet, and have naked soles. The skull is robust with a long muzzle.

== Distribution and habitat ==
Abrothrix illuteus is found at moderate elevations in Catamarca Province and Tucumán Province, in northwestern Argentina, on the eastern flanks of the Andes at elevations between about 700 and 2,500 m (2,300 and 8,200 ft). Its presence at higher altitudes in the Nevados del Aconquija mountains on the border between the two provinces requires confirmation. Its typical habitat is moist forests of Podocarpus parlatorei and Alnus acuminata on steep hillsides. At higher elevations it inhabits areas with rough grasses and bushes alongside streams.

== Ecology ==
In a research study into the diet of the barn owl (Tyto alba) in Tucumán Province, this mouse was the second most frequently found item.

== Status ==
Although the population size and abundance of this mouse is unclear, it has a large range and is present in some protected areas, so the International Union for Conservation of Nature has assessed its conservation status as being of "least concern". The chief threats it faces are likely to be from logging, wildfires and cattle grazing.

== Literature cited ==
- Musser, G.G. and Carleton, M.D. 2005. Superfamily Muroidea. Pp. 894–1531 in Wilson, D.E. and Reeder, D.M. (eds.). Mammal Species of the World: a taxonomic and geographic reference. 3rd ed. Baltimore: The Johns Hopkins University Press, 2 vols., 2142 pp. ISBN 978-0-8018-8221-0
