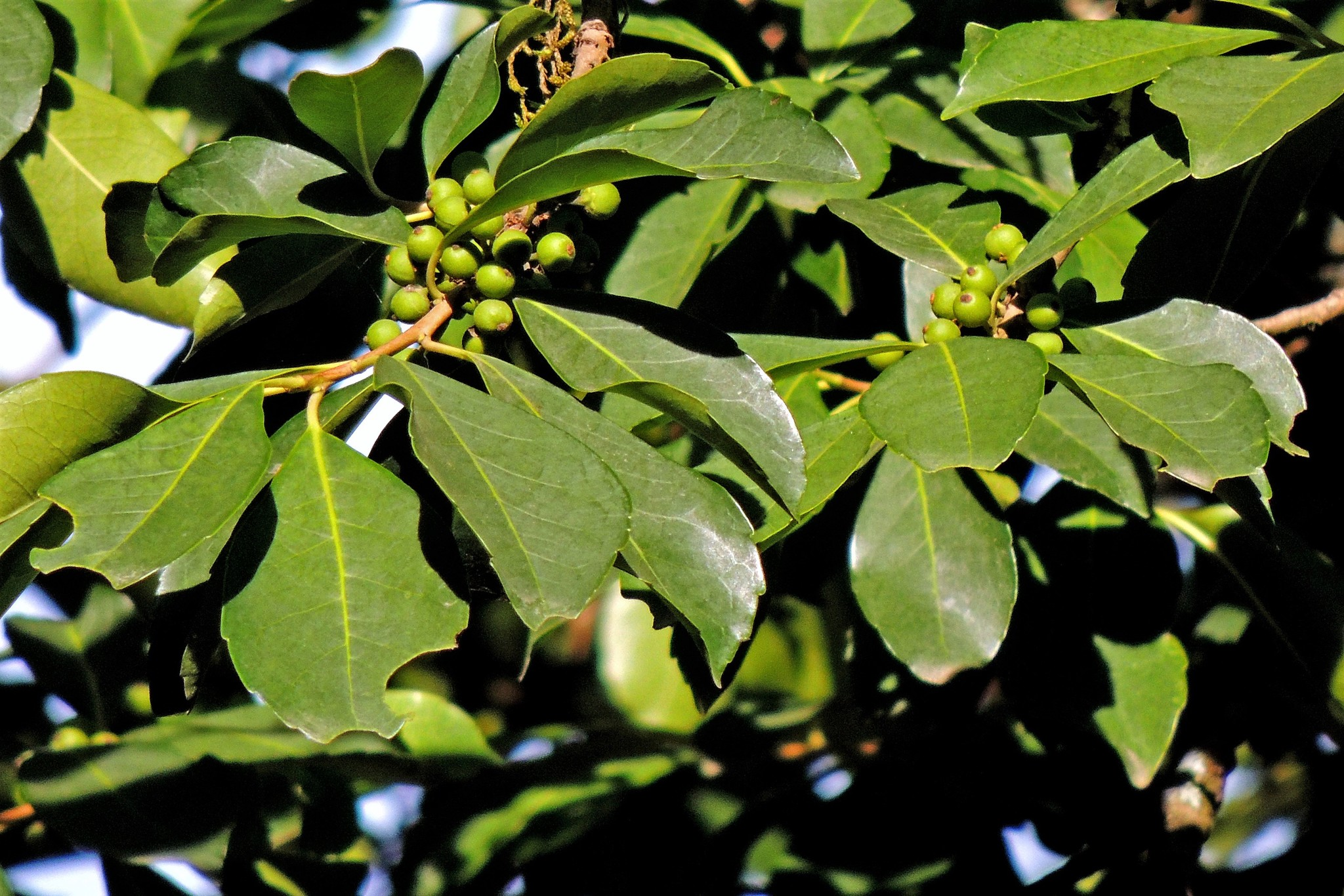

Conservation status
- Data Deficient (IUCN 3.1)

Scientific classification
- Kingdom: Plantae
- Clade: Tracheophytes
- Clade: Angiosperms
- Clade: Eudicots
- Clade: Asterids
- Order: Aquifoliales
- Family: Aquifoliaceae
- Genus: Ilex
- Species: I. argentina

Binomial name
- Ilex argentina Lillo

Synonyms
- Ilex herzogii Loes.; Ilex tucumanensis Speg.

= Ilex argentina =

Species of tree

Ilex argentina, commonly known as Argentina holly, is a species of tree native to northwestern Argentina and Bolivia.

It is native to the Bolivian and Southern Andean Yungas, humid montane forests along the eastern slope of the Andes and Sierras Pampeanas mountain ranges. It is found between 900 and 1800 meters elevation in the Southern Andean Yungas, and up to 2300 meters elevation in the Bolivian Yungas.
