= J. australis =

J. australis may refer to:

- Juania australis, a flowering plant species found only in Chile
- Juglans australis, the Nogal Criollo, a plant species found in Argentina and Bolivia

== See also ==
- Australis (disambiguation)
