= Ocotea porphyria =

Scientific classification
- Kingdom: Plantae
- Clade: Tracheophytes
- Clade: Angiosperms
- Clade: Magnoliids
- Order: Laurales
- Family: Lauraceae
- Genus: Ocotea
- Species: O. porphyria

Binomial name
- Ocotea porphyria (Griseb.) van der Werff

Synonyms
- Cinnamomum porphyrium (Griseb.) Kosterm.; Nectandra porphyria Griseb.; Phoebe porphyria (Griseb.) Mez

Species of evergreen tree

Ocotea porphyria is a species of evergreen tree in the laurel family (Lauraceae). It is native to southern Bolivia and northwestern Argentina, where it lives in humid montane forests, or Yungas, on the eastern side of the Andes. Common names include laurel del cerro, laurel la falda, laurel tucumano, and ayuínandí.

== Description ==
Ocotea porphyria can grow up to 25 meters in height. It typically has a straight, cylindrical trunk up to 130 cm in diameter, and a broad, many-branched crown.

The leaves are simple, elliptic-lanceolate or oblong-lanceolate in shape, and 7 to 18 cm long by 3 to 6 cm wide. They are deep green and glabrous (smooth) on the upper surface and lighter green on the underside, with reddish veins. Leaves are alternate, on 6–20 mm glabrous petioles.

Flowers are yellowish-white, 3 to 4 mm in diameter, and hermaphroditic, on axillary panicles up to 15 cm long. Fruits are a single-seeded ovoid brown berry, 13–18 mm long by 8–10 mm wide, carried by a cupped receptacle. Inside is an ovoid brown seed, 9–13 mm long by 6–8 mm wide.

== Distribution and habitat ==
Ocotea porphyria is native to northwestern Argentina, in the provinces of Jujuy, Salta, Tucumán, Catamarca, and adjacent portions of southern Bolivia.

It is a characteristic tree of the Southern Andean Yungas, montane moist forests on the eastern slopes of the Andes and Sierras Pampeanas mountain ranges. It occurs from approximately 800 to 2500 meters elevation, and is of greatest ecological importance between 1,300 and 1,500 meters elevation.

== Uses ==
The tree is harvested from the wild for timber. The wood is hard, heavy, and fairly durable, with a straight to irregular grain, light brown heartwood, and yellowish-white sapwood. It is used for furniture and construction, including doors and window frames.
