= Aconquija National Park =

National park in Tucumán, Argentina

- Parque Nacional Aconquija; Campo de los Alisos National Park
- IUCN category II (national park)
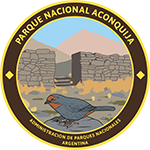
- Emblem of the Aconquija National Park

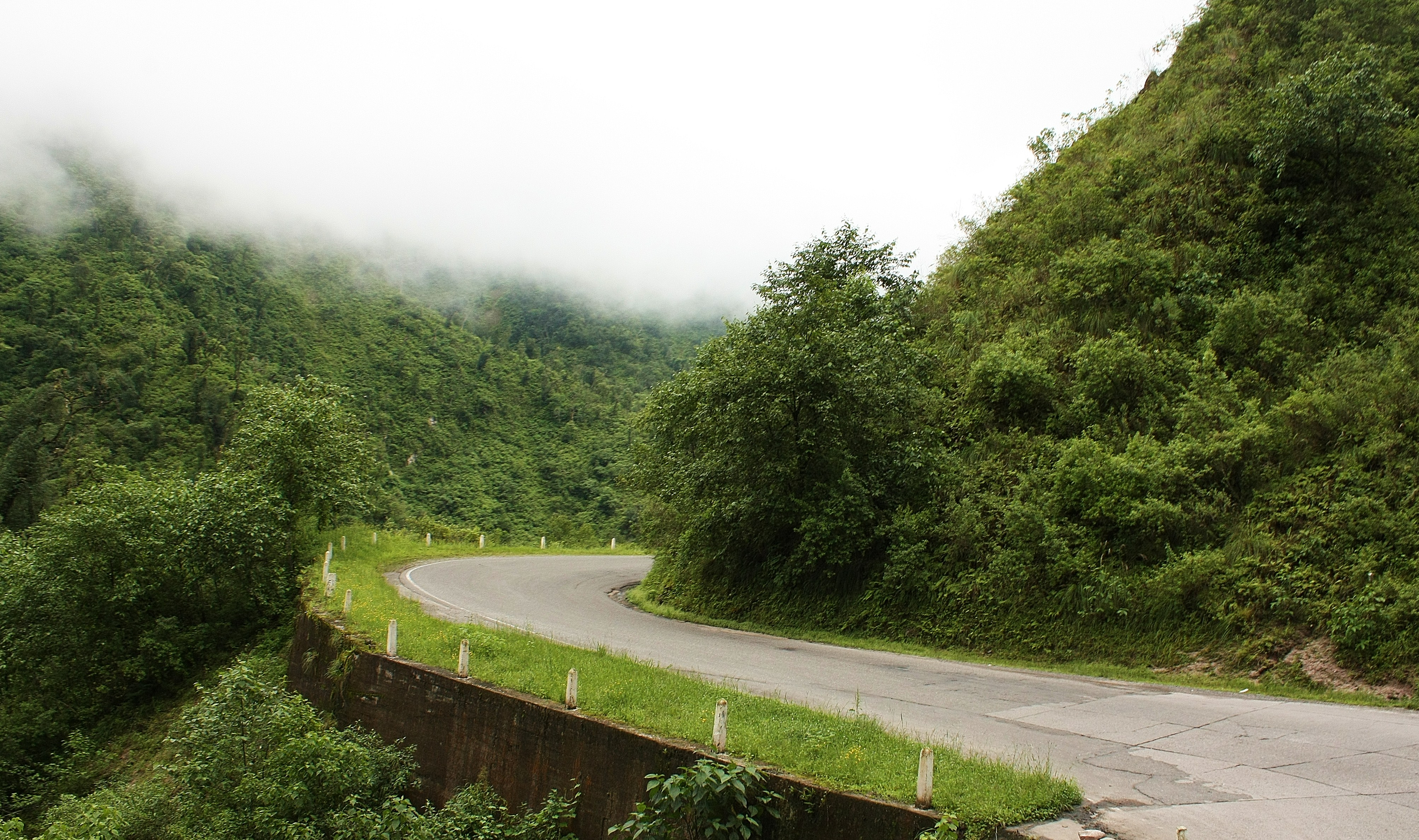
- The Southern Andean Yungas in the park

- Location within Argentina
- Location: Tucumán Province, Argentina
- Nearest city: Concepción
- Coordinates: 27°13′S 65°58′W
- Area: 499.94 km^{2} (193.03 sq mi)
- Established: August 9, 1995

Aconquija National Park (Spanish: Parque Nacional Aconquija), formerly known as Campo de los Alisos National Park, is a federal protected area in Tucumán Province, Argentina. Established on 9 August 1995, it houses a representative sample of the Southern Andean Yungas montane forest biodiversity in good state of conservation.

== Geography ==
Located in the Chicligasta Department on the eastern slope of the Aconquija Mountains (Nevados del Aconquija), the park has an area of 499.94 km^{2} (193.03 sq mi). The Aconquija Mountains are the southern extension of the Calchaquí Valleys, the western first steps raising from the Gran Chaco plain into the Andes. The park protects the headwaters of the Jaya and las Pavas rivers.

== Flora and fauna ==
Flora and fauna vary considerably with elevation. The Southern Andean Yungas montane forests extend from 1500 to 2000 meters elevation. Andean alder (Alnus acuminata subsp. acuminata) is the predominant tree, forming pure stands in places. The Central Andean puna montane grasslands cover higher elevations, and there is snow-covered mountain terrain at 5,000 m (16,000 ft).

Wildlife in the park includes the puma (Puma concolor), ocelot (Leopardus pardalis), Andean mountain cat (Leopardus jacobita), Pampas cat (Leopardus colocolo), Geoffroy's cat (Leopardus geoffroyi), South American gray fox (Lycalopex griseus), Pampas fox (Lycalopex gymnocercus), guanaco (Lama guanicoe), gray brocket (Mazama gouazoubira), Chaco owl (Strix chacoensis), turquoise-fronted amazon (Amazona aestiva), mountain parakeet (Psilopsiagon aurifrons), and grey-hooded parakeet (Psilopsiagon aymara).

Endangered animals that dwell in the park include the Andean mountain cat, furtive tuco-tuco (Ctenomys occultus) Chaco eagle (Buteogallus coronatus), and the frog Gastrotheca gracilis. Vulnerable birds include the white-tailed shrike-tyrant (Agriornis albicauda), rufous-throated dipper (Cinclus schulzii), and Tucumán mountain finch (Poospiza baeri).

== History ==
Campo de los Alisos National Park ("field of the alders") was established in 1995. In 2018 the park was renamed Aconquija National Park and enlarged to its current boundaries.

== Climate ==
Climate data for Potrero del Clavillo, Elevation: 1383 m (1993–2018)
Month	Jan	Feb	Mar	Apr	May	Jun	Jul	Aug	Sep	Oct	Nov	Dec	Year
Record high °C (°F)	32.0 (89.6)	31.6 (88.9)	31.0 (87.8)	30.0 (86.0)	31.2 (88.2)	34.0 (93.2)	33.0 (91.4)	35.6 (96.1)	35.0 (95.0)	34.0 (93.2)	35.0 (95.0)	34.0 (93.2)	35.6 (96.1)
Mean daily maximum °C (°F)	25.0 (77.0)	23.9 (75.0)	22.4 (72.3)	19.8 (67.6)	16.5 (61.7)	15.5 (59.9)	15.3 (59.5)	17.5 (63.5)	19.4 (66.9)	21.8 (71.2)	23.1 (73.6)	24.7 (76.5)	20.4 (68.7)
Daily mean °C (°F)	19.1 (66.4)	18.2 (64.8)	16.8 (62.2)	13.3 (55.9)	9.4 (48.9)	6.8 (44.2)	5.8 (42.4)	8.0 (46.4)	10.9 (51.6)	14.8 (58.6)	17.0 (62.6)	18.7 (65.7)	13.2 (55.8)
Mean daily minimum °C (°F)	13.5 (56.3)	12.9 (55.2)	11.7 (53.1)	7.6 (45.7)	3.3 (37.9)	−0.8 (30.6)	−2.3 (27.9)	−0.4 (31.3)	3.0 (37.4)	7.8 (46.0)	10.3 (50.5)	12.6 (54.7)	6.6 (43.9)
Record low °C (°F)	5.0 (41.0)	1.0 (33.8)	1.8 (35.2)	−3.0 (26.6)	−7.4 (18.7)	−12.0 (10.4)	−12.0 (10.4)	−9.6 (14.7)	−8.4 (16.9)	−5.4 (22.3)	−0.2 (31.6)	2.0 (35.6)	−12.0 (10.4)
Average precipitation mm (inches)	223.7 (8.81)	187.9 (7.40)	189.0 (7.44)	81.7 (3.22)	41.3 (1.63)	12.9 (0.51)	8.5 (0.33)	11.2 (0.44)	19.8 (0.78)	67.4 (2.65)	89.8 (3.54)	156.7 (6.17)	1,089.9 (42.91)
Source: Red Hidrológica Nacional
