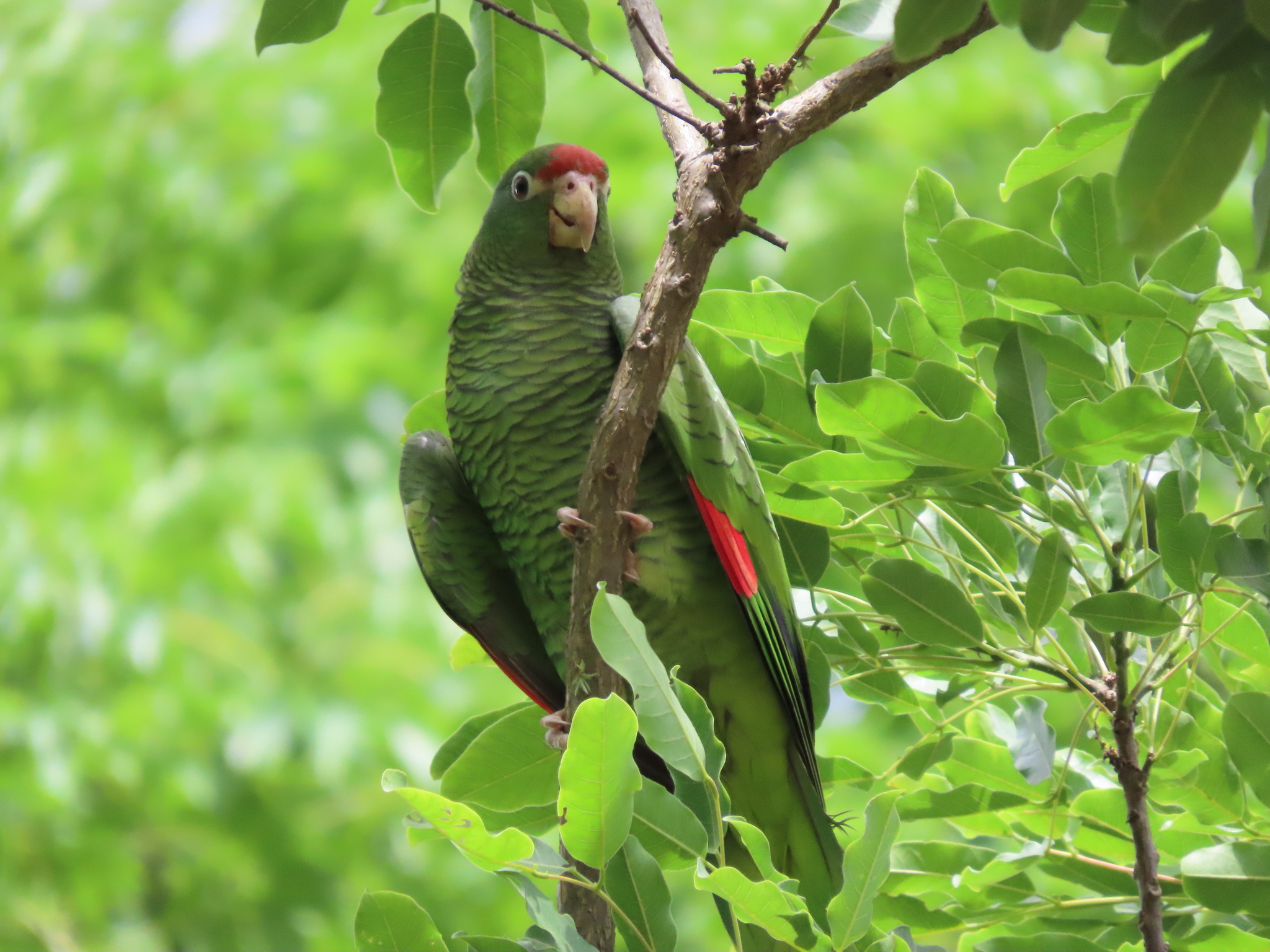
- In Jujuy, Argentina

Conservation status
- Vulnerable (IUCN 3.1)
- CITES Appendix I

Scientific classification
- Kingdom: Animalia
- Phylum: Chordata
- Class: Aves
- Order: Psittaciformes
- Family: Psittacidae
- Genus: Amazona
- Species: A. tucumana

Binomial name
- Amazona tucumana (Cabanis, 1885)

= Tucumán amazon =

Species of bird

The Tucumán amazon (Amazona tucumana), also known as the Tucumán parrot, alder amazon, or alder parrot, is a vulnerable species of bird in subfamily Arinae of the family Psittacidae, the African and New World parrots. It is found in Argentina and Bolivia.

== Taxonomy and systematics ==
The Tucumán amazon and the red-spectacled amazon (A. pretrei) have been considered conspecific but are now treated as sister species. The Tucuman amazon is monotypic.

== Description ==
The Tucumán amazon is about 31 cm (12 in) long and weighs 250 to 280 g (8.8 to 9.9 oz). It is mostly green, with black edges on the body feathers that give a scaly appearance. Its forehead and sometimes its lores are red. Bare white skin surrounds its eye. Its lower thighs are orange-yellow, its primary coverts red, and its undertail coverts yellow-green. Its primaries have blue tips and its tail feathers yellowish tips. Immature birds have entirely green thighs.

== Distribution and habitat ==
The Tucumán amazon is found from Santa Cruz and Chuquisaca departments in Bolivia south into Argentina as far as Catamarca Province. It inhabits the Yungas bioregion in montane woodland characterized by pure stands of alder (Alnus acuminata) or Podocarpus parlatorei. In elevation it mostly ranges between 1,600 and 2,600 m (5,200 and 8,500 ft) but occurs as low as 500 m (1,600 ft).

== Behavior ==
=== Movement ===
The Tucumán amazon moves seasonally between higher elevations and, in August to October, as low as 500 m (1,600 ft) at the Chaco/Yungas ecotone.

=== Feeding ===
A study in Argentina found that almost a quarter of the Tucumán amazon's diet was the fruits and seeds of Podocarpus parlatorei; most of the rest was taken from six other plants. Winter food was dominated by Acacia seeds. Flowers and fruits of both native and introduced plants were eaten.

=== Breeding ===
The Tucumán amazon nests between November and January. It uses cavities in large trees, often those excavated by woodpeckers. In the Argentina study, the average clutch was 3.6 eggs and ranged from one to five. The incubation period was 26 to 30 days and fledging occurred 50 to 58 days after hatch. In another study, nest success was related to the availability of Podocarpus parlatorei fruits.

=== Vocalization ===
The Tucumán amazon makes a "variety of screeches and calls, including shrill shrieks and lower-pitched barks." Its flight call is "a repeated, somewhat yelping, shrill "quiowk"."

== Status ==
The IUCN originally assessed the Tucumán amazon in 2004 as being of Least Concern, then in 2005 as Near Threatened, and since 2011 as Vulnerable. It has a somewhat limited range and its estimated population of fewer than 15,000 mature individuals is believed to be decreasing. "The species is susceptible to trapping for trade, which is considered the main driver of rapid population declines". "Habitat in Argentina is highly degraded and consists of small, isolated fragments." It is considered locally common but generally uncommon. It occurs in several protected areas, but less than 25% of its preferred habitat is protected.
