= Gastrotheca gracilis =

Conservation status
- Endangered (IUCN 3.1)

Scientific classification
- Kingdom: Animalia
- Phylum: Chordata
- Class: Amphibia
- Order: Anura
- Family: Hemiphractidae
- Genus: Gastrotheca
- Species: G. gracilis

Binomial name
- Gastrotheca gracilis Laurent, 1969

Species of frog

Gastrotheca gracilis, commonly known as the La Banderita marsupial frog, is a species of frog in the family Hemiphractidae. It is found in northwestern Argentina and possibly Bolivia.

== Habitat ==
It dwells in the Southern Andean Yungas montane forests and adjacent high-altitude Central Andean puna grasslands of Catamarca and Tucumán provinces in northwestern Argentina, from 1,400 and 2,800 m (4,600 and 9,200 ft) in elevation. It known from five locations, and it has an estimated extent of occurrence of 1,407 km^{2}.

Adults dwell in tree crowns, tree holes, and rock crevices.

Scientists have reported this frog in protected places: Campo de los Alisos National Park and Los Sosa Provincial Reserve.

== Reproduction ==
During amplexus (breeding), male frogs place eggs in a marsupial pouch on the female's back. The eggs hatch and the larvae develop in the pouch. The females later deposit the larvae in seasonal or intermittent pools and streams to complete their metamorphosis.

== Threats ==
The species is assessed as Endangered and is threatened by habitat loss associated with deforestation and wildfires. In 2014, a large number of pigs entered Los Sosa Provincial Reserve and caused significant larval mortality.
