= El Rey National Park =

National Park of Argentina

- Parque Nacional El Rey
- IUCN category II (national park)
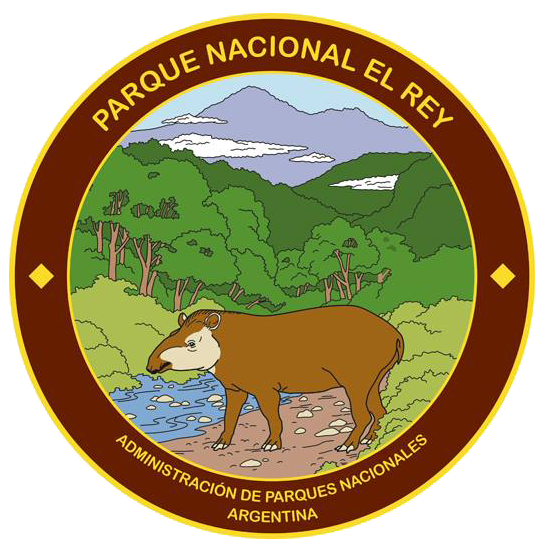
- Emblem of the El Rey National Park

- Location within Argentina
- Location: Anta Department, Salta Province, Argent
- Coordinates: 24°42′S 64°38′W
- Area: 441.62 km^{2} (170.51 sq mi)

The El Rey National Park (Spanish: Parque Nacional El Rey) is a national park of Argentina, located in the Anta Department, province of Salta, in the Argentine Northwest, 80 km from the provincial capital. It has an area of 441.62 km^{2}.

The park was created in order to preserve a representative sample of the Southern Andean Yungas ecoregion and transition environments. The climate is warm, and annual rainfall oscillates between 500 and 700 mm. The flora is varied, showing different species in five levels according to height (from 750 to 2,000 m). The fauna includes tapirs, anteaters and peccaries, as well as fish in the rivers, brooks and lakes. The tapir or anta, which eats aquatic plants, is the largest South American mammal, weighing up to 300 kg.

The protected area was inhabited by farmer indigenous groups, the oldest inhabitants of the Yungas, and includes archaeological sites.

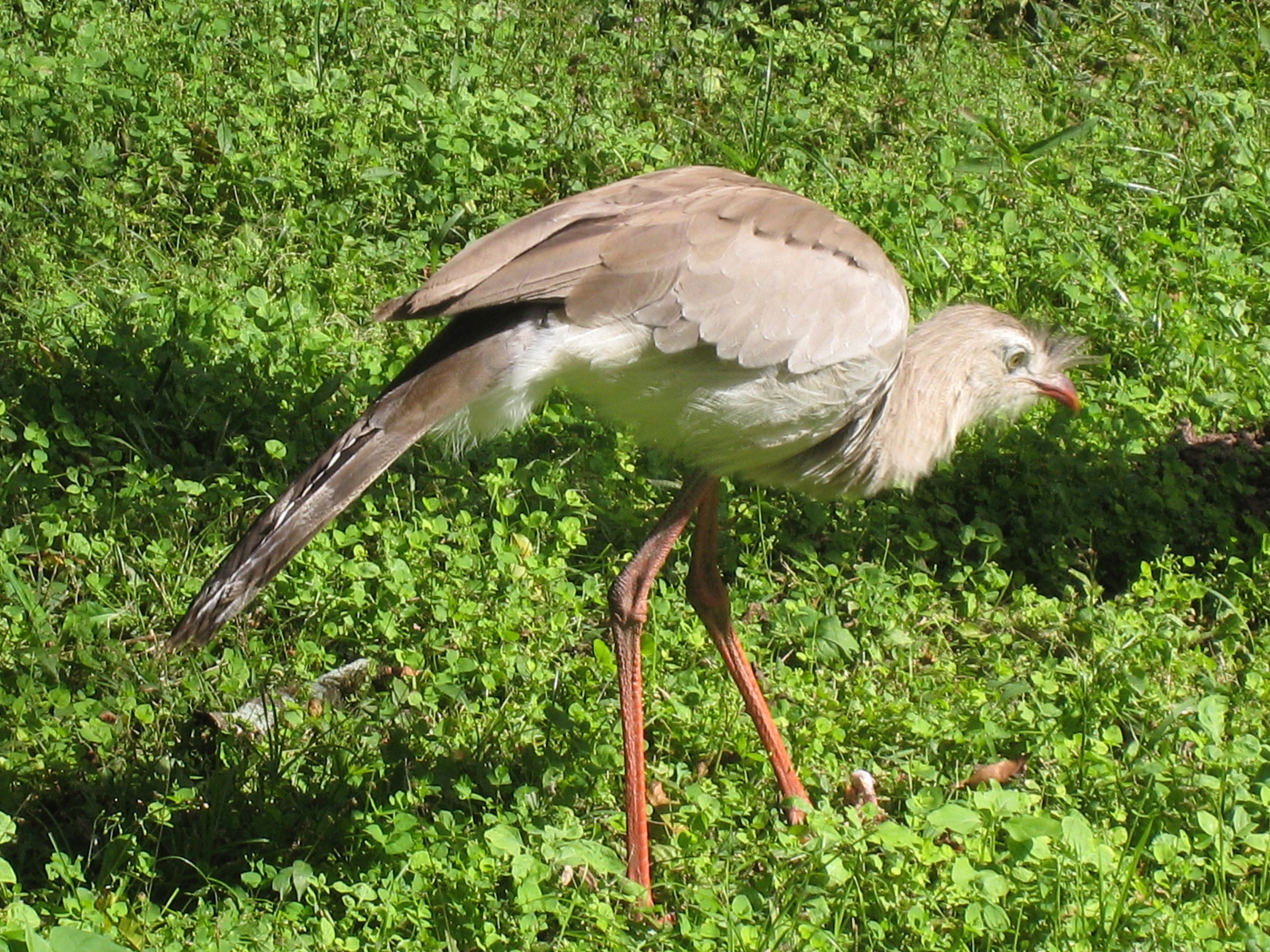
Cariama cristata, El Rey National Park.

== Sources ==
- Administración de Parques Nacionales, Parque Nacional El Rey - National Parks Administration of Argentina (in Spanish)
- Park Description on site of Salta Province
