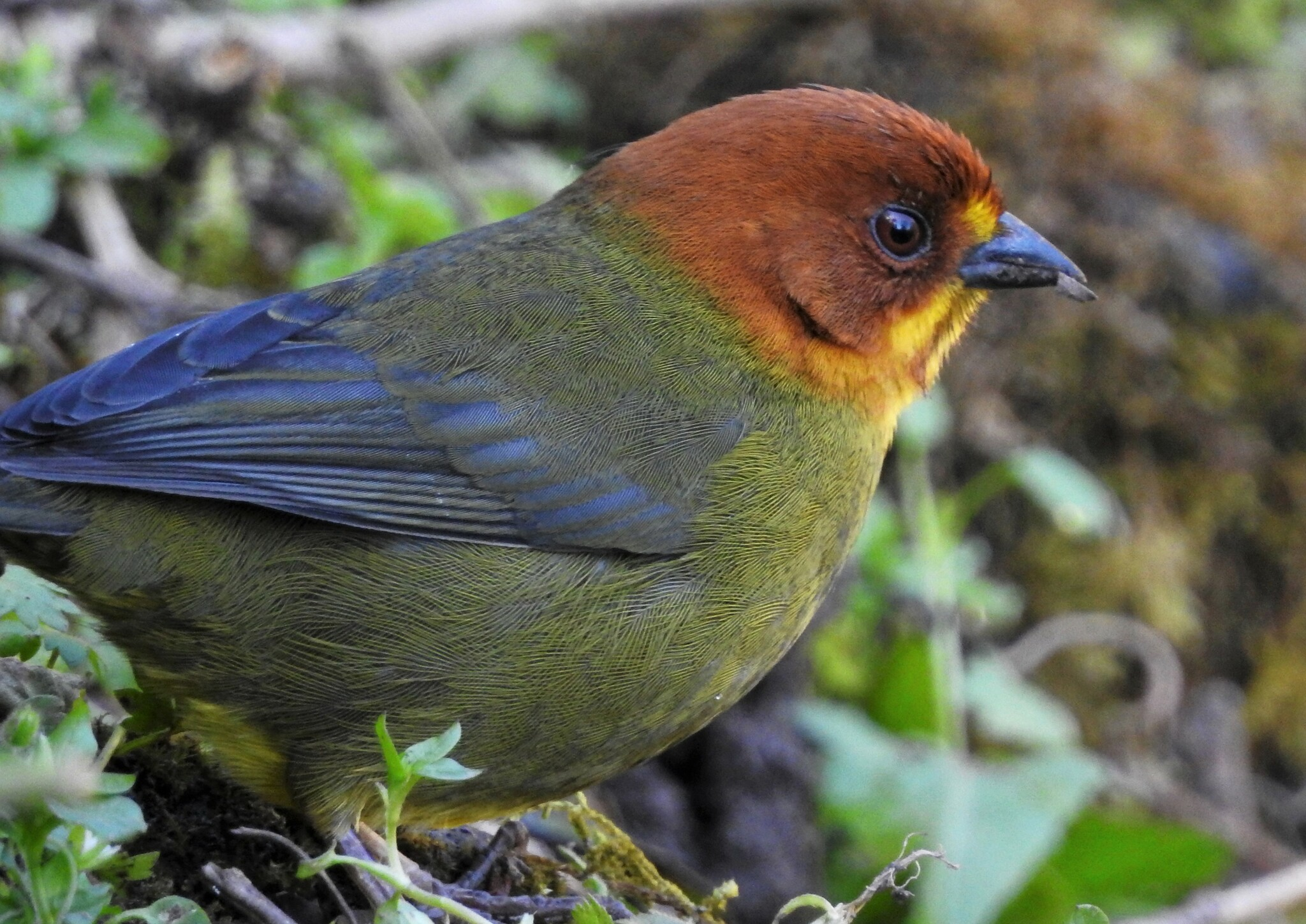

Conservation status
- Least Concern (IUCN 3.1)

Scientific classification
- Kingdom: Animalia
- Phylum: Chordata
- Class: Aves
- Order: Passeriformes
- Family: Passerellidae
- Genus: Atlapetes
- Species: A. fulviceps

Binomial name
- Atlapetes fulviceps (d'Orbigny & Lafresnaye, 1837)

= Fulvous-headed brushfinch =

Species of bird

The fulvous-headed brushfinch (Atlapetes fulviceps) is a species of bird in the family Passerellidae, the New World sparrows. It is found in Argentina and Bolivia.

== Taxonomy and systematics ==
The fulvous-headed brushfinch was formally described in 1837 with the binomial Emberiza fulviceps. It was later reassigned to its present genus Atlapetes where it and the yellow-striped brushfinch (A. citriellus) are sister species.

The fulvous-headed brushfinch is monotypic.

== Description ==
The fulvous-headed brushfinch is about 17 cm (6.7 in) long. One individual weighed 28.2 g (0.99 oz). The sexes have the same plumage. Adults have a mostly cinnamon head with a yellow patch above the lores, a yellow "moustche", and a yellow chin and throat. Their upperparts are green. Their tail is slate-gray with green feather edges. Their wings are mostly slate gray with greenish upperwng coverts and green edges on the flight feathers. They have an olive band across the breast that continues along the flanks and onto the crissum. Their belly is yellow. They have a medium brown iris, a black bill, and brownish legs and feet.

== Distribution and habitat ==
The fulvous-headed brushfinch is found on the eastern slope of the Andes from La Paz Department in northwestern Bolivia south into far northern Argentina's Jujuy and Salta provinces. It inhabits semi-open landscapes including the edges of Yungas and Polylepis forest, secondary forest, and the undergrowth of woodlands, especially those dominated by alder (Alnus). It often is found near streams. In elevation it ranges mostly from 1,500 to 3,600 m (4,900 to 11,800 ft) but in winter can be found as low as about 400 m (1,300 ft).

== Behavior ==
=== Movement ===
The fulvous-headed brushfinch is generally a year-round resident but some movement to lower elevations in winter has been noted.

=== Feeding ===
The fulvous-headed brushfinch feeds on insects, seeds, and smaller amounts of fruits. It forages on the ground or up to about 3 m (10 ft) above it in vegetation. It also sometimes catches insects in mid-air with a sally. It typically is seen singly or in pairs.

=== Breeding ===
The fulvous-headed brushfinch's breeding season has not been defined but includes January. Nothing else is known about the species' breeding biology.

=== Vocalization ===
One description of the fulvous-headed brushfinch's song is "a thin, high-pitched tsit-tsit-tsiddle tsoo tsoo tsoo". Another is "short and explosive...e.g. tii’Chew-Chew-Chew! or [a] faster twi-tew’tew’tew, sometimes lengthened to pit-twee pit’ Chew-Chew-Chew". Its calls are "a thin zit" and in alarm a "pi ziue".

== Status ==
The IUCN has assessed the fulvous-headed brushfinch as being of Least Concern. It has a large range; its population size is not known and is believed to be decreasing. No immediate threats have been identified. It is considered locally common.
