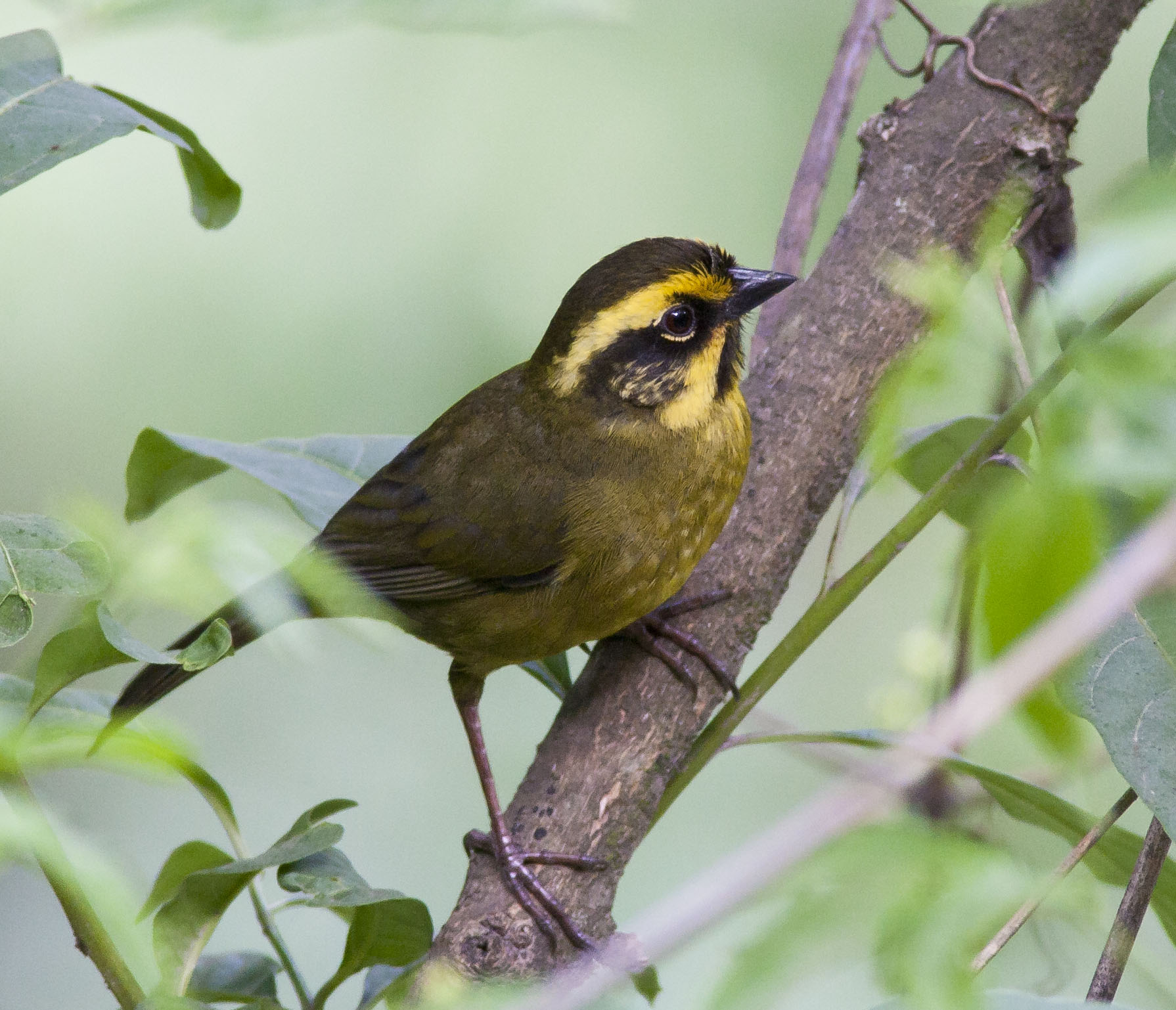

Conservation status
- Least Concern (IUCN 3.1)

Scientific classification
- Kingdom: Animalia
- Phylum: Chordata
- Class: Aves
- Order: Passeriformes
- Family: Passerellidae
- Genus: Atlapetes
- Species: A. citrinellus

Binomial name
- Atlapetes citrinellus (Cabanis, 1883)

= Yellow-striped brushfinch =

Species of bird

The yellow-striped brushfinch (Atlapetes citrinellus) is a species of bird in the family Passerellidae, the New World sparrows. It is endemic to Argentina.

== Taxonomy and systematics ==
The yellow-striped brushfinch was formally described by the German ornithologist Jean Cabanis in 1883 with the binomial Buarremon (Atlapetes) cintrinellus. Genus Buarremon was merged into Atlapetes in the early twentieth century. The specific epithet citrinellus means lemon-colored.

The yellow-striped brushfinch is monotypic. It and the fulvous-headed brushfinch (A. fulviceps) are sister species.

== Description ==
The yellow-striped brushfinch is about 17 cm (6.7 in) long; one male weighed 28 g (0.99 oz). The sexes have the same plumage. Adults have a blackish forehead that merges to dark brownish olive on the crown and nape. They have a wide yellow supercilium, a white eye-ring, and a blackish line from the lores through the eye. The line continues around the back of the ear coverts, which are grizzled yellow. They are bright yellow on the cheek below the ear coverts and have a black chin whose color continues as wide black stripes below the yellow. Their upperparts are greenish. Their wings are blackish with greenish yellow edges on the flight feathers. Their tail is blackish with greenish yellow feather edges. Their underparts are mostly olive with a somewhat yellower center of the belly and undertail coverts. They have a dark reddish iris, a black bill, and grayish black to dusky pink legs and feet.

== Distribution and habitat ==
The yellow-striped brushfinch is found in the Andes of northwestern Argentina from Jujuy and Salta provinces south to Catamarca Province. It is primarily a bird of the Yungas forest. Though that biome also stretches north well into Bolivia, it is not known why this species' range does not continue throughout it. It also regularly occurs in woodland dominated by alder (Alnus) and in secondary forest. In all forest types it favors the undergrowth and edges. In elevation it ranges between 700 and 3,100 m (2,300 and 10,200 ft).

== Behavior ==
=== Movement ===
The yellow-striped brushfinch is generally a year-round resident but some movement to lower elevations in winter has been noted.

=== Feeding ===
The yellow-striped brushfinch's diet has not been extensively studied. It is known to feed primarily on invertebrates and also a variety of fruits, all of which are taken year-round. It is an important disperser of fruit seeds. It usually forages in pairs or family groups. It takes most live prey on the ground or low in vegetation; fruit is taken mostly in the understory but also as high as the canopy.

=== Breeding ===
The yellow-striped brushfinch's breeding season has not been fully defined but is believed to span at least November to February. Its nest has not been formally described, but some have been found in small shrubs. The clutch is two or three eggs that are pinkish with brown spots. The incubation period, time to fledging, and details of parental care are not known.

=== Vocalization ===
The yellow-striped brushfinch's song is " a simple and explosive chip-pip’ chew-chew-chew" and its call a "tsip".

== Status ==
The IUCN has assessed the yellow-striped brushfinch as being of Least Concern. It has a small range; its population size is not known and is believed to be decreasing. No immediate threats have been identified. It is not used in trade and there are no specific conservation actions in progress. It is considered common, with the highest population density in Tucumán Province.
