= Canchalagua =

Canchalagua is a Spanish-derived common name for several plants. Canchalagua may refer to:

- Schkuhria pinnata, a plant in the sunflower family native to South America and used medicinally
- Zeltnera venusta, a plant in the gentian family native to North America
