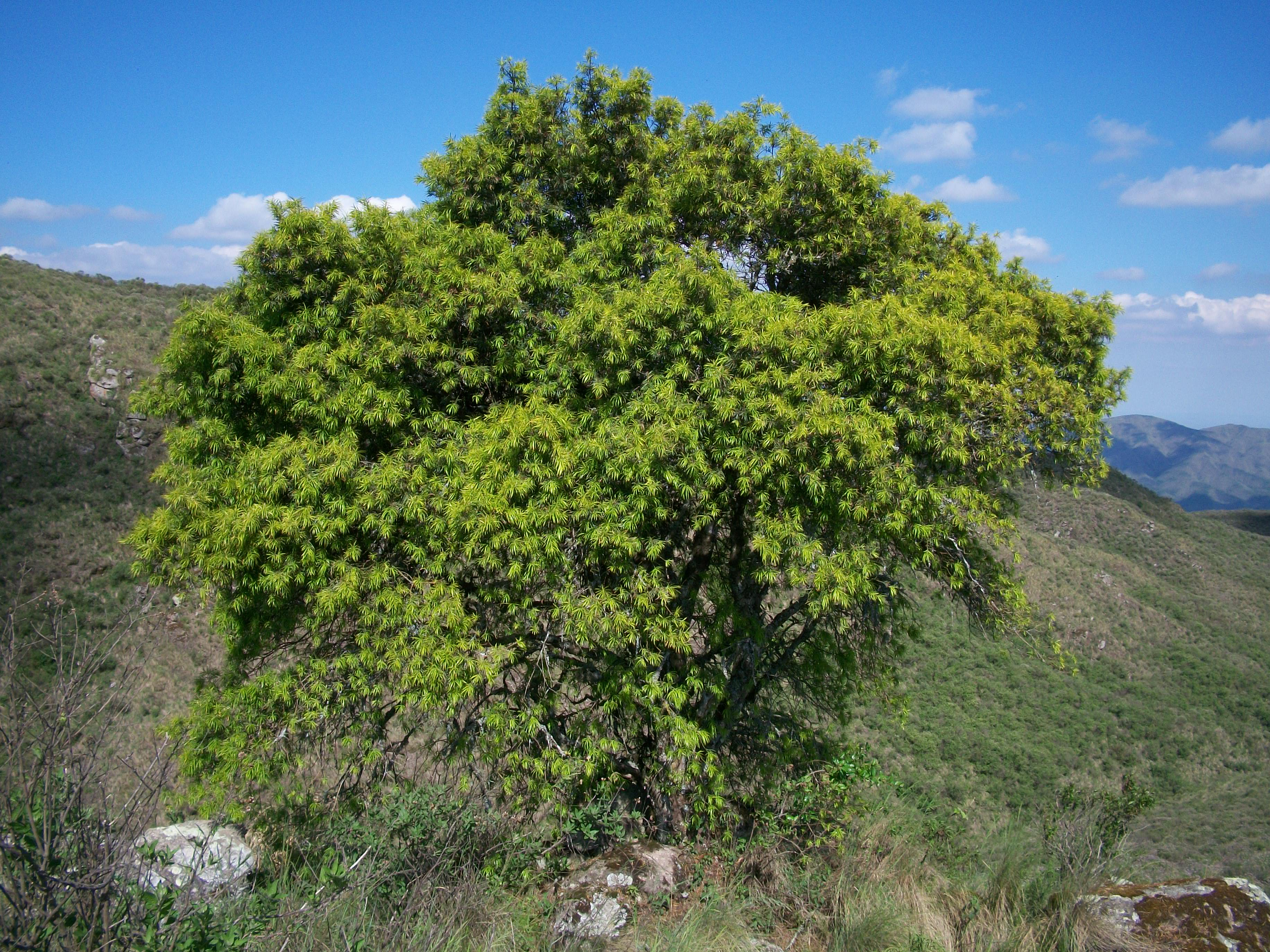

Conservation status
- Vulnerable (IUCN 3.1)
- CITES Appendix I

Scientific classification
- Kingdom: Plantae
- Clade: Tracheophytes
- Clade: Gymnosperms
- Division: Pinophyta
- Class: Pinopsida
- Order: Araucariales
- Family: Podocarpaceae
- Genus: Podocarpus
- Species: P. parlatorei

Binomial name
- Podocarpus parlatorei Pilg.

Synonyms
- Nageia angustifolia Kuntze; Podocarpus angustifolius Parl.

= Podocarpus parlatorei =

Species of conifer

Podocarpus parlatorei is a species of tree in the family Podocarpaceae, native to Argentina and Bolivia, where it grows on steep hillsides on the eastern flanks of the Andes. It has been harvested commercially in the past but is now protected under CITES. The International Union for Conservation of Nature has assessed its status as being "near threatened".

== Description ==
Podocarpus parlatorei is a shrub or tree that grows up to 15 (occasionally 30) meters high. The trunk is straight and cylindrical and branches often grow from close to the ground. The leaves are linear to falcate (sickle-shaped), straight, 2.5 to 9 cm (1.0 to 3.5 in) long, 2 to 3 mm (0.08 to 0.12 in) wide, with an acute pungent apex. The seeds are spherical, 5 to 6 mm (0.20 to 0.24 in) long.

== Distribution and habitat ==
Podocarpus parlatorei is endemic to the eastern flanks of the Andes in northwestern Bolivia and Argentina. It occurs at elevations between 950 and 3,000 m (3,100 and 9,800 ft) and occupies a strip of countryside about 1,000 km (600 mi) long in a north/south direction and up to 100 km (60 mi) wide. The population is fragmented into a number of subpopulations by the lowland forests and dry river valleys that dissect the steep-sided foothills.

== Ecology ==
In the south of its range, this species forms pure stands, but further north it tends to grow under a canopy formed by Alnus acuminata, Cedrela angustifolia, and Juglans australis. The flowers are wind pollinated and the seed is dispersed by birds and mammals that eat the fleshy fruits. These include guans (Penelope spp.), band-tailed pigeons (Patagioenas fasciata), and the hog-nosed skunk (Conepatus chinga). The gray grass mouse (Abrothrix illuteus) lives on steep hillsides amongst the Podocarpus parlatorei and Alnus acuminata trees.

== Uses ==
The timber is lightweight, soft and easy to work. It has been used commercially for making pencils and for building construction, flooring, furniture making, veneers, posts and utensils. Its international commercial trade has now been banned by its listing in Appendix I of CITES because excessive logging was depleting populations, but it is still harvested for local use. It is also used in field boundaries and around houses as hedges.

== Status ==
In the past, this tree was listed by the International Union for Conservation of Nature as being "data deficient", however more recent research has enabled the IUCN to evaluate its status. The population is naturally fragmented because of geographical features and although in the past much logging has reduced populations, the remaining populations are more secure, being in remote areas or on steep hillsides where access is difficult. The species is vulnerable to man-made disturbances such as logging and fires; although it is a pioneer species able to regenerate in grassland or at forest fringes, increased aridity and rising temperatures are expected to negatively impact the species. For these reasons, the IUCN has assessed its conservation status as vulnerable. Nonetheless, as a cold-tolerant, subtropical montane conifer with a fragmented population, research suggests that it might be able to shift its range to higher altitudes during warmer periods and potentially cope with climate change as it has in the past during climatic fluctuations.
