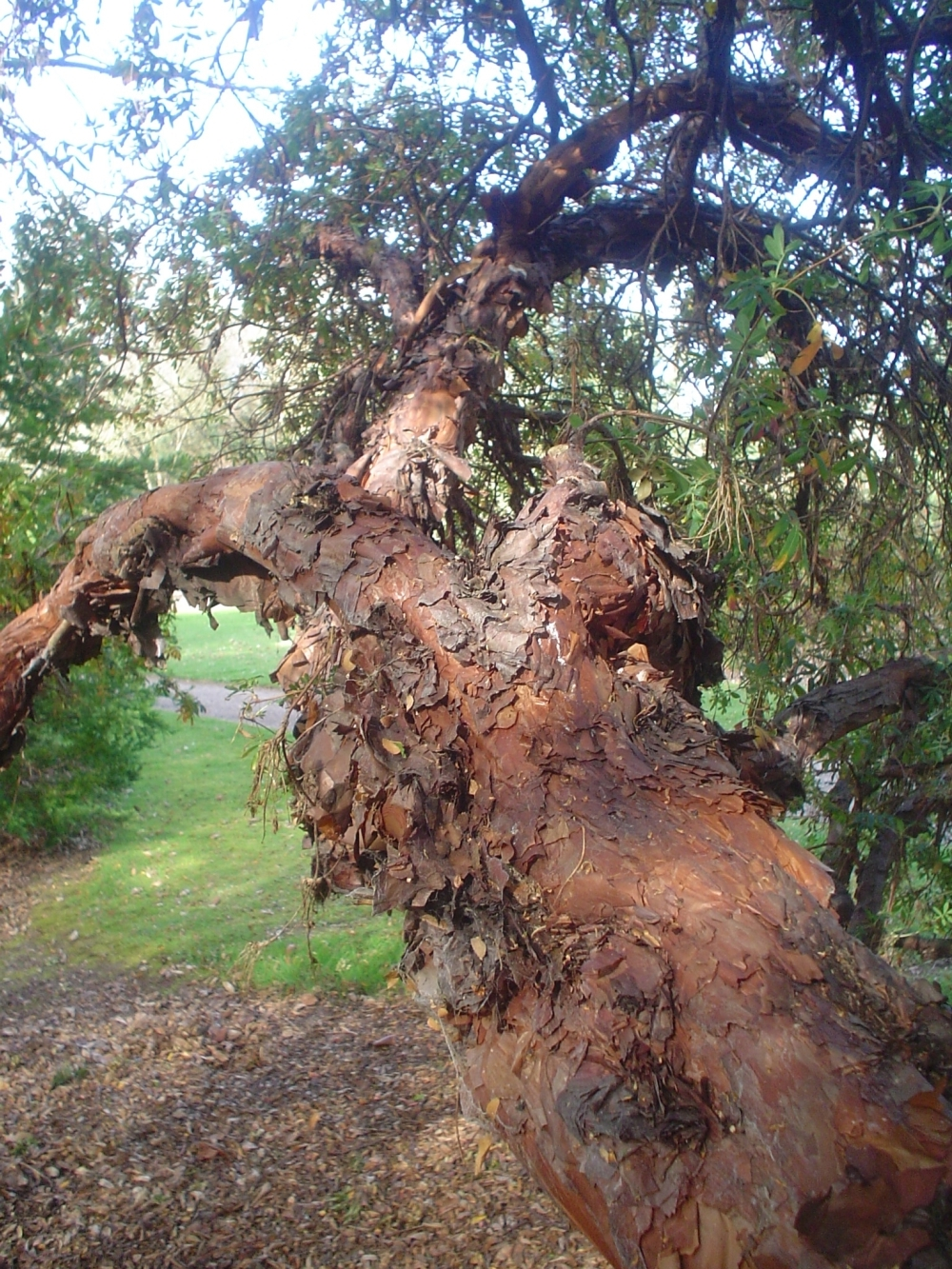

Scientific classification
- Kingdom: Plantae
- Clade: Tracheophytes
- Clade: Angiosperms
- Clade: Eudicots
- Clade: Rosids
- Order: Rosales
- Family: Rosaceae
- Genus: Polylepis
- Species: P. australis

Binomial name
- Polylepis australis Bitter

= Polylepis australis =

Species of tree

Polylepis australis, also known locally as tabaquillo or queñoa is a tree endemic of central Argentina, member of the family Rosaceae. The genus Polylepis originated in the eastern Andean forests of eastern South America.

== Description ==
The plant has small, pinnate leaves, 7–10 cm long, normally composed of five or seven leaflets. In harsh winters, Polylepis australis survives by producing rolls of loose, papery like exfoliating brownish bark; the rough outer covering of the woody stem of tree.

== Range and habitat ==
Polylepis australis is native to the Sierras Pampeanas, a series of north–south-running ranges on the eastern side of the Andes in north-central Argentina, in the provinces of Catamarca, Córdoba, Jujuy, Salta, and Tucumán. It occurs from 1200 to 2900 meters elevation, most commonly in high-elevation forests and woodlands.

The southernmost stands of Polylepis australis are located in the high Córdoba Mountains of central Argentina (1,200–2,884 m above sea level).

South American Polylepis mountain forests are recognised as being one of the most endangered forest ecosystems in the world. During a reforestation project, D. Renison (University of Córdoba, Argentina) found that the germination of Polylepis australis stands decreases significantly with decreasing tree coverage. The first results of additional studies carried out in collaboration with Isabell Hensen (University of Halle, Germany) indicate that a clear negative correlation exists between the viability of seeds of Polylepis australis and the degree of human influence on the woodland stands. Seeds of Polylepis australis exhibited a great variation in terms of mass and percent seed germination among individual trees and among geographical regions.

== Gallery ==
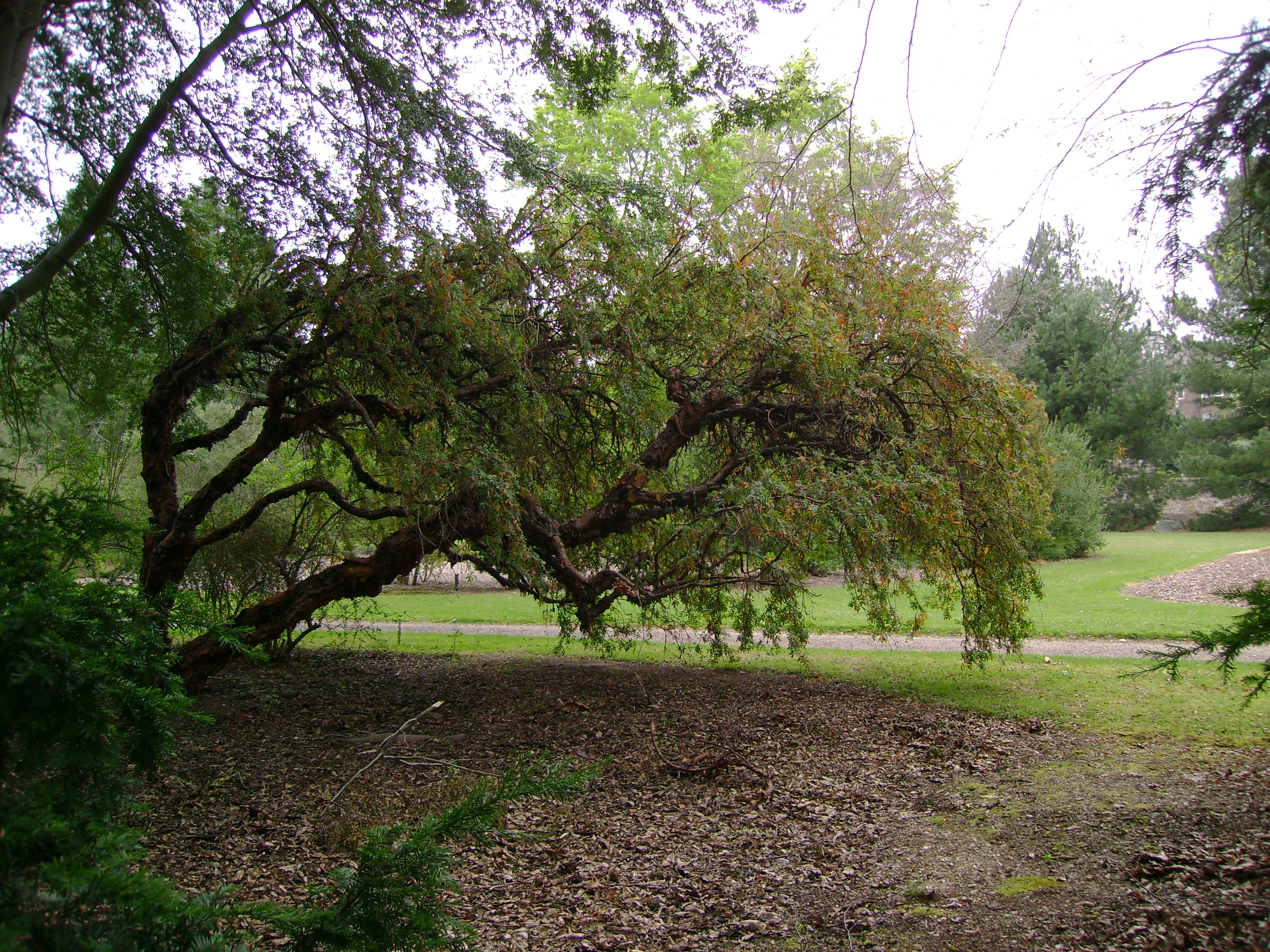
Polylepis australis

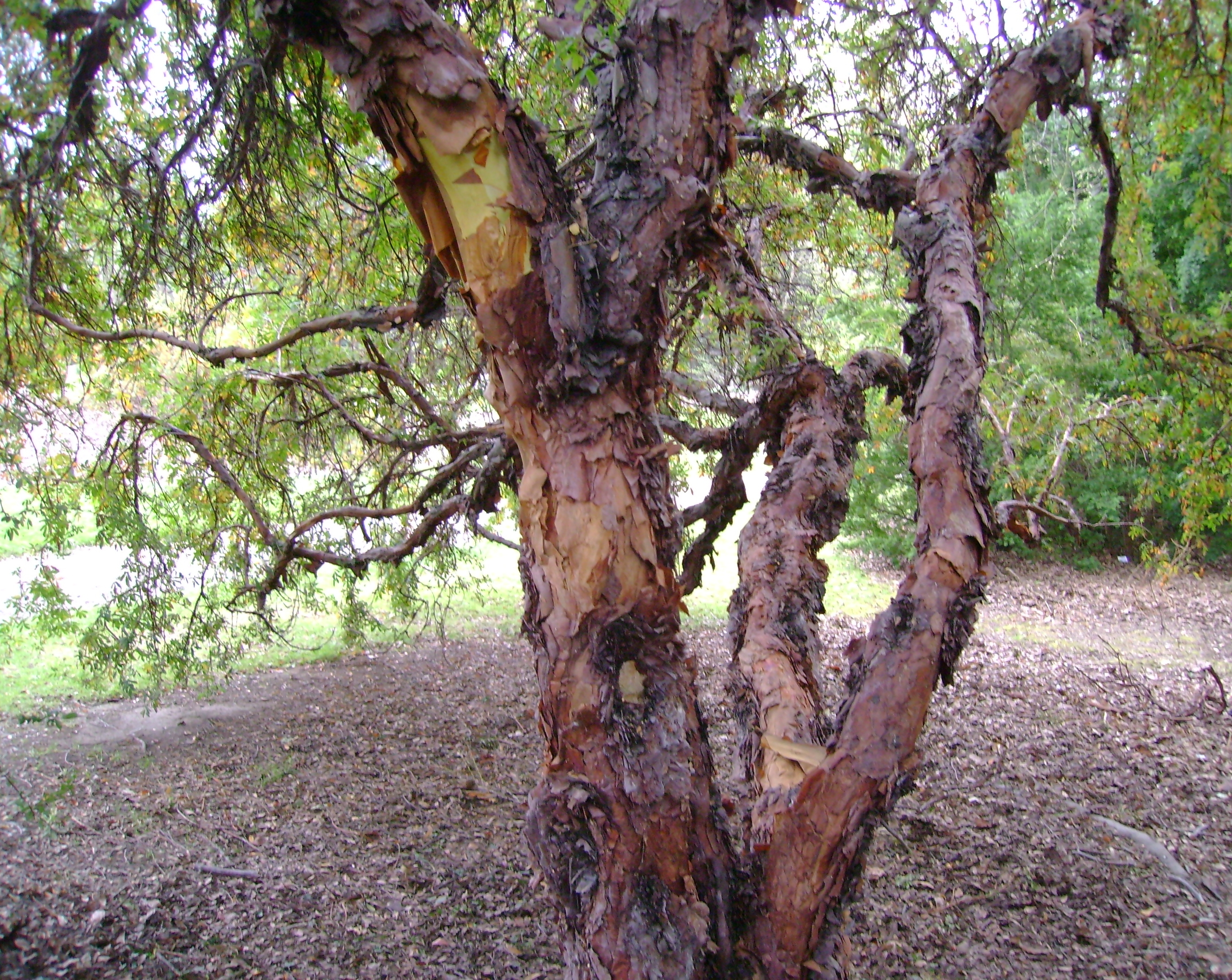
Polylepis australis

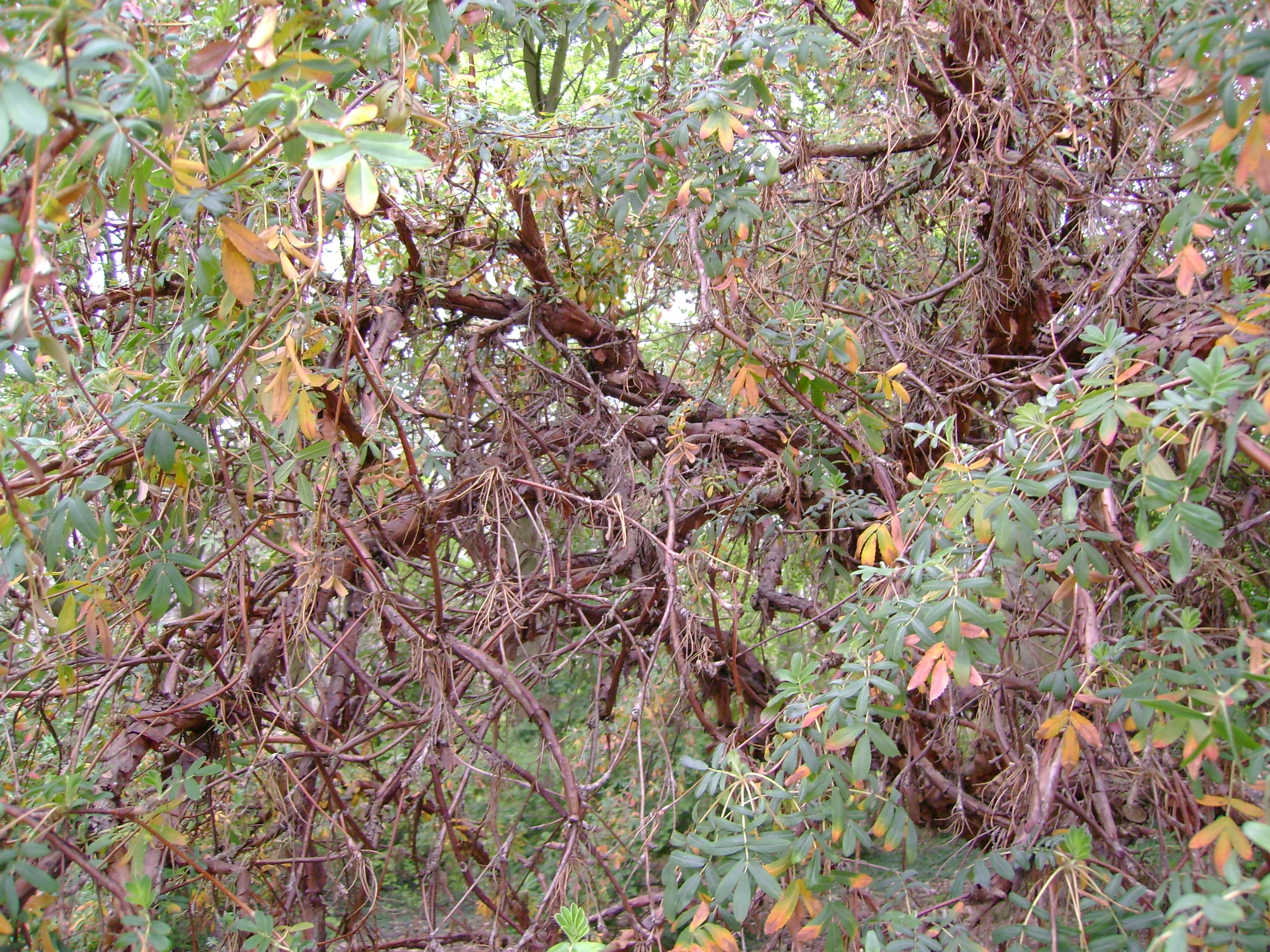
Polylepis australis leaves

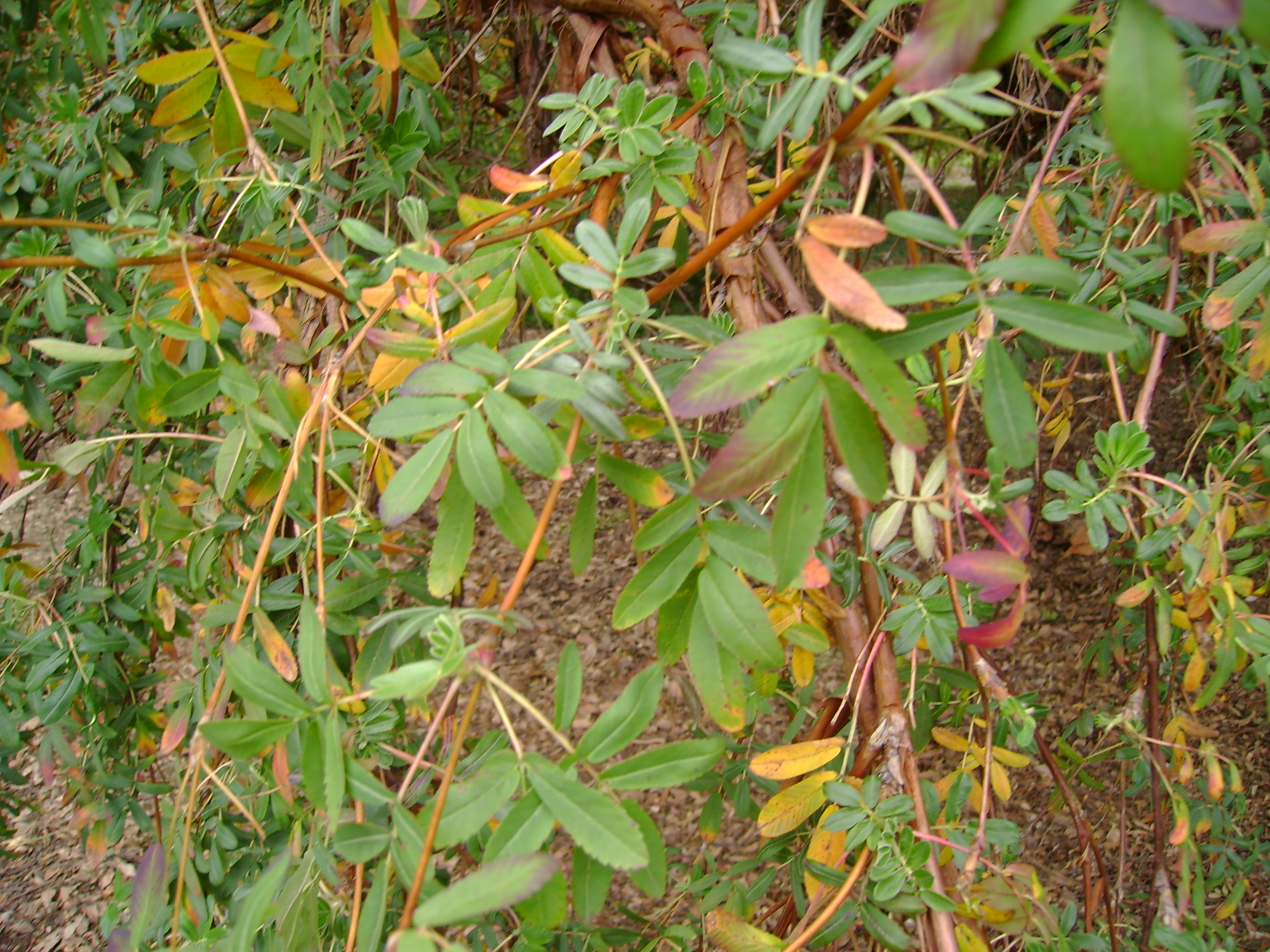
Polylepis australis leaves

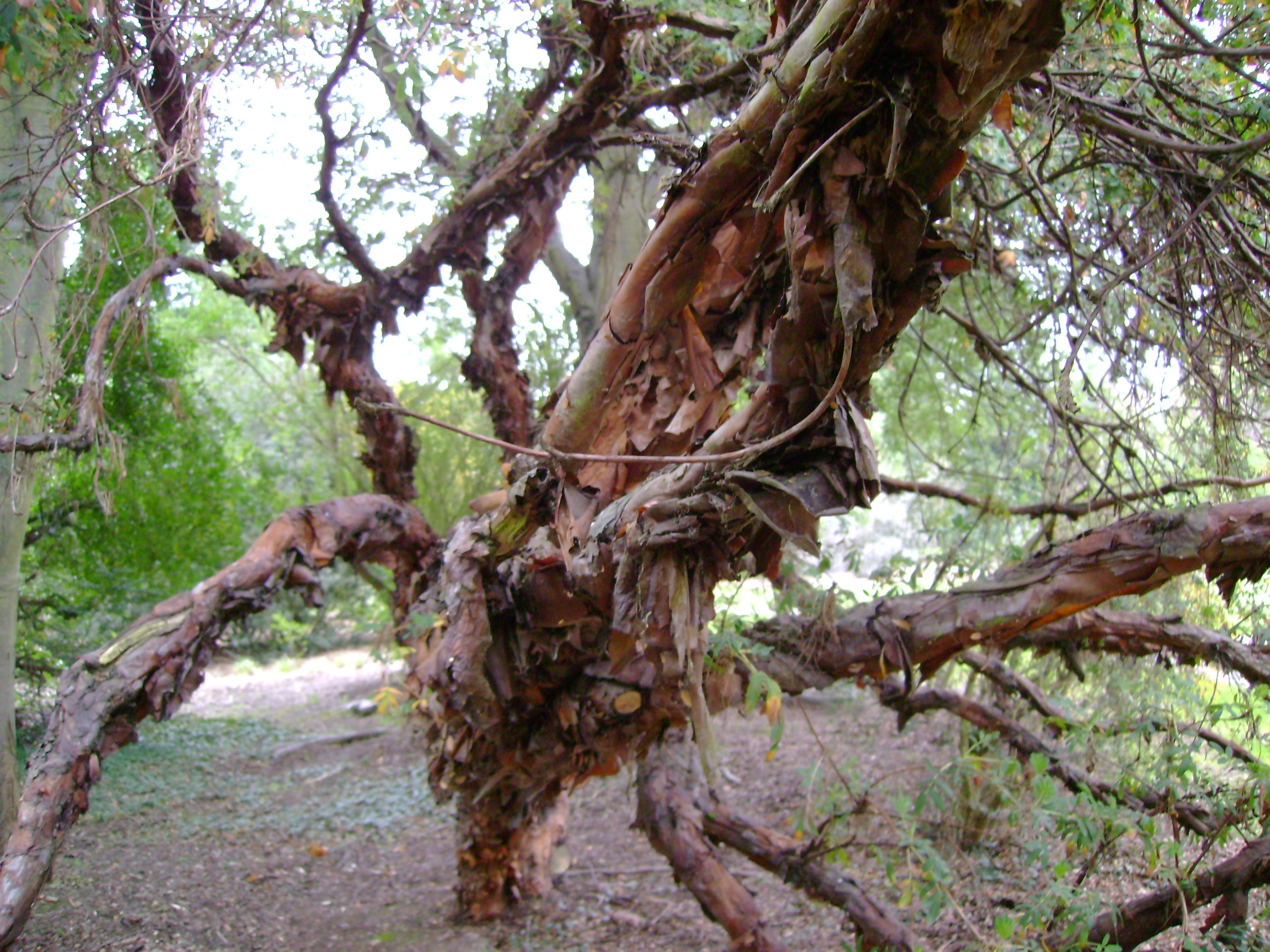
Polylepis australis trunk

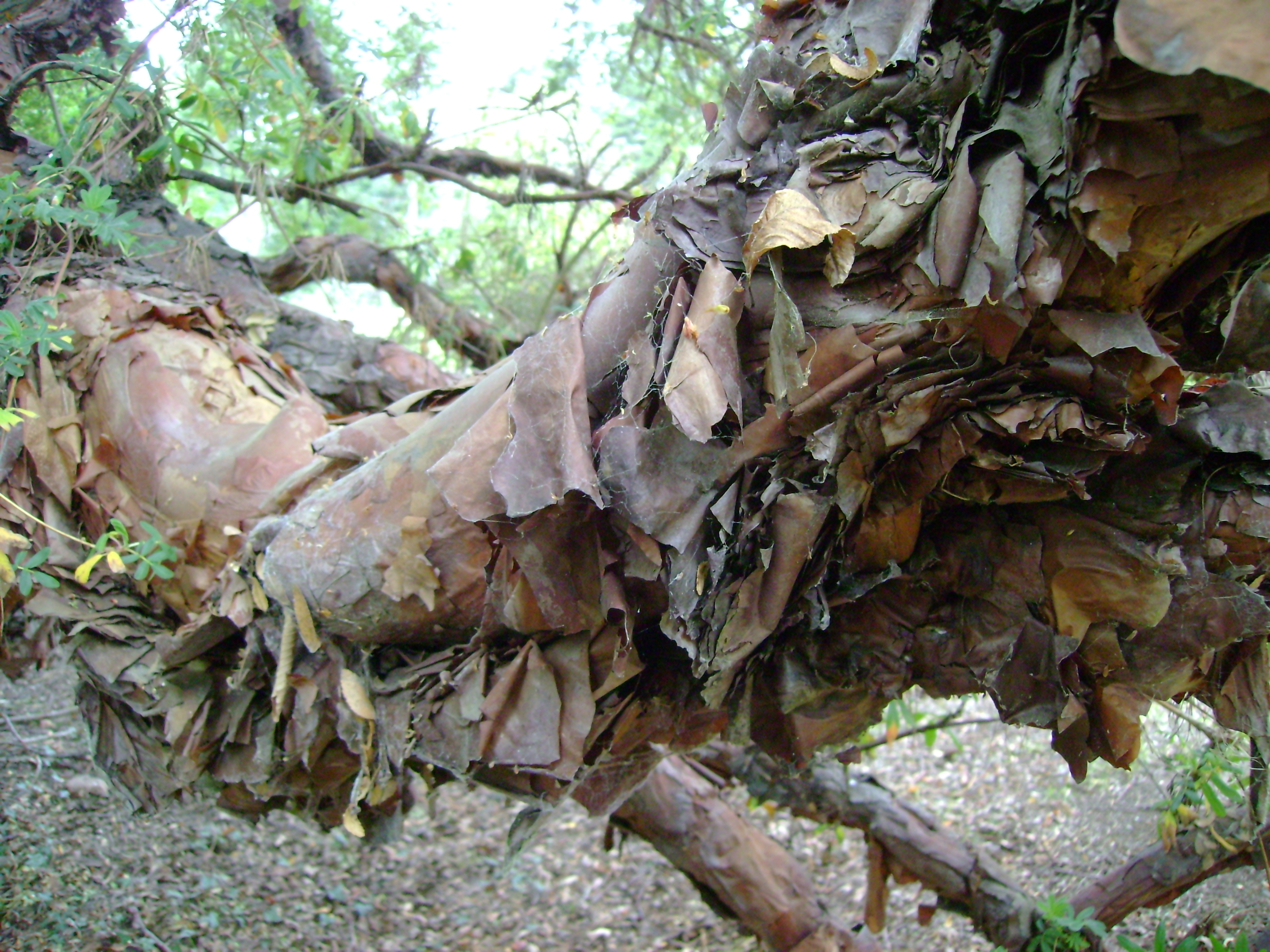
Polylepis australis trunk

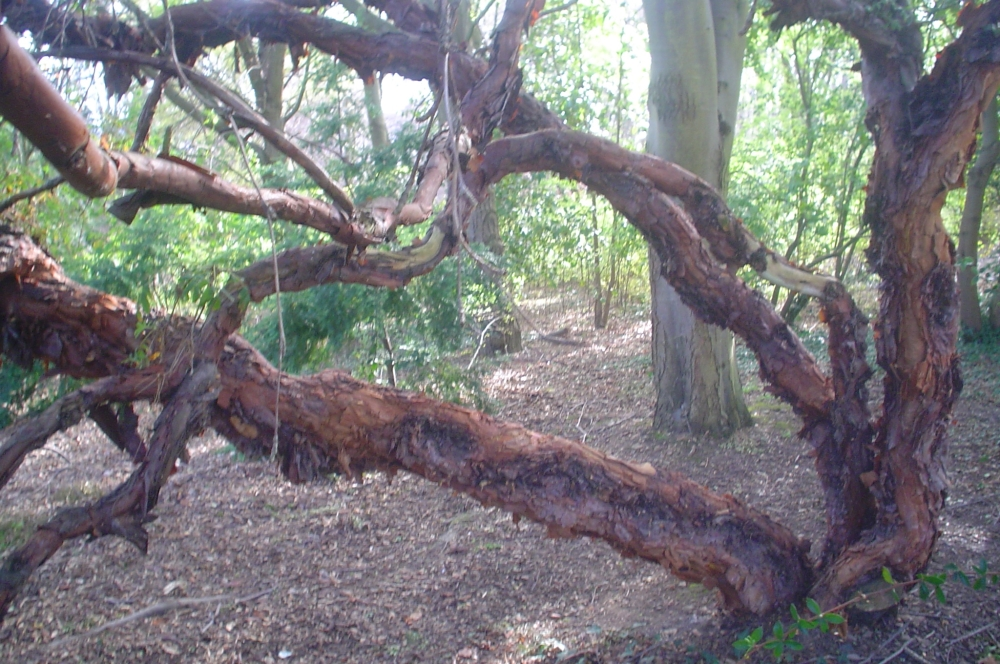
Polylepis australis

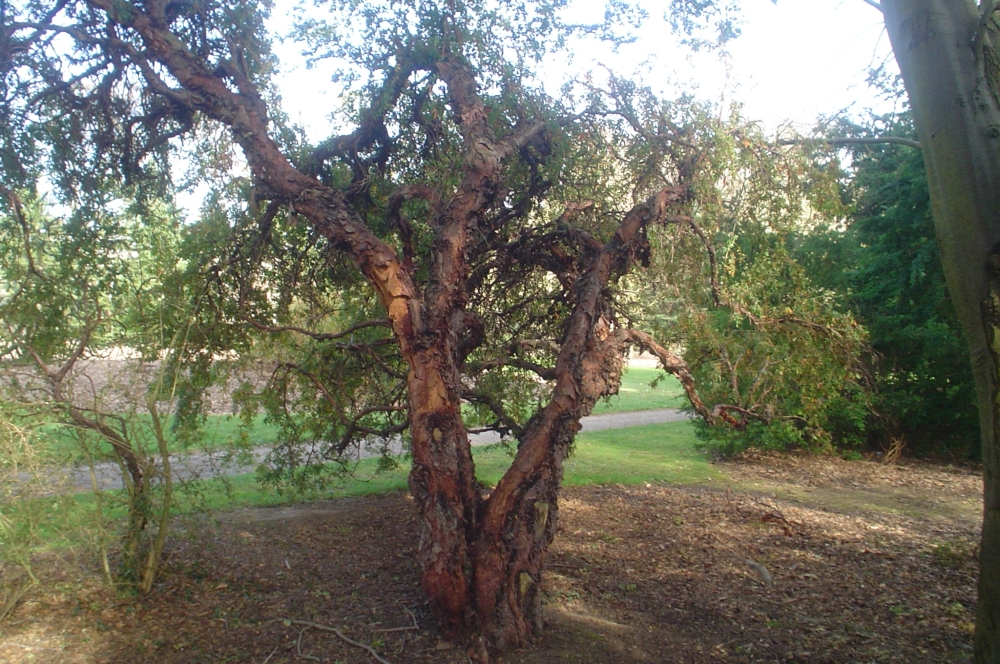
Polylepis australis

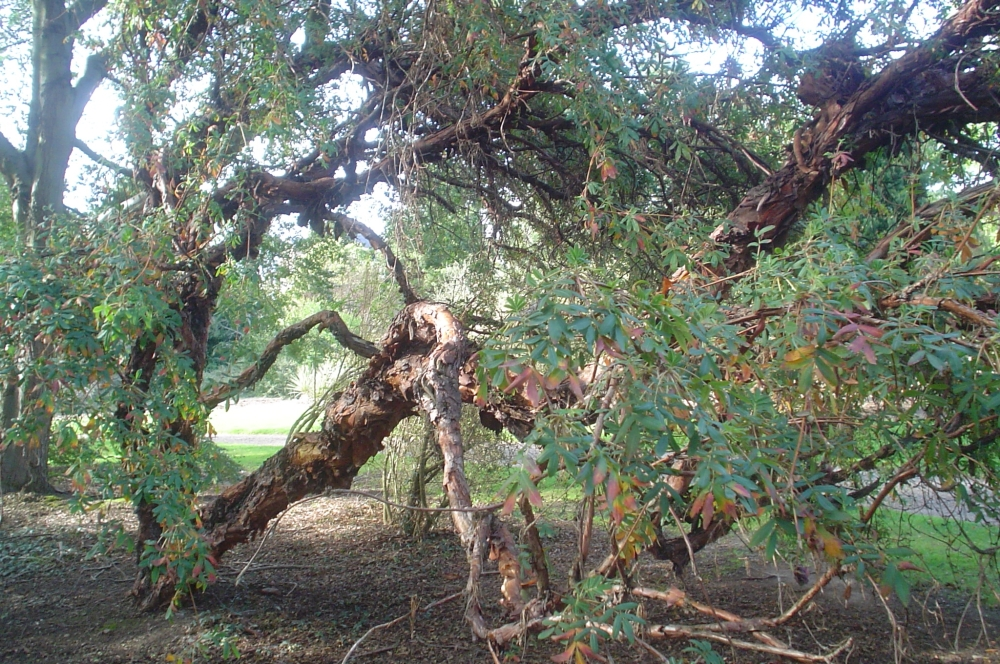
Polylepis australis

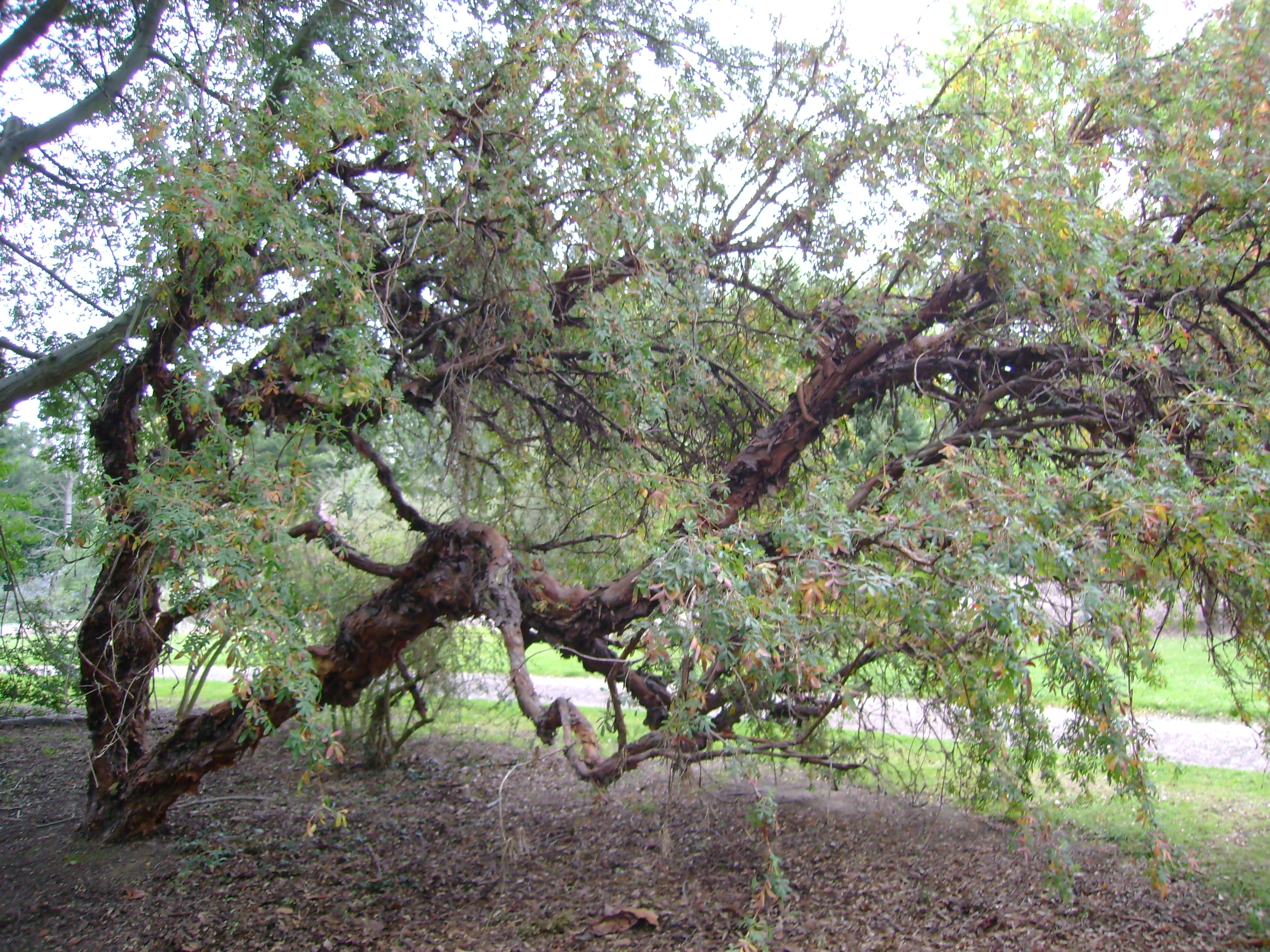
Polylepis australis
