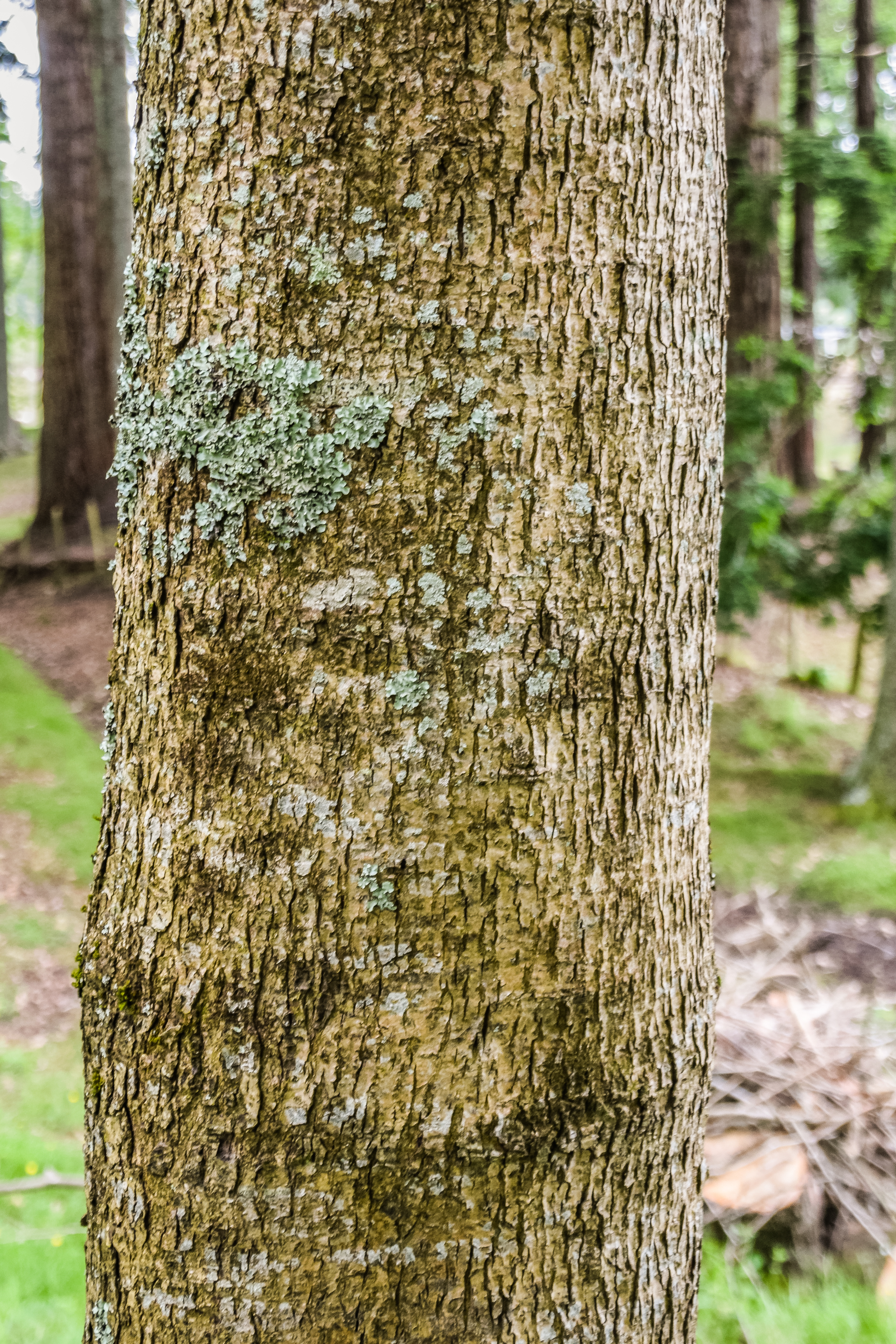
- Bark of tree at Hackfalls Arboretum, New Zealand

Conservation status
- Near Threatened (IUCN 2.3)

Scientific classification
- Kingdom: Plantae
- Clade: Tracheophytes
- Clade: Angiosperms
- Clade: Eudicots
- Clade: Rosids
- Order: Fagales
- Family: Juglandaceae
- Genus: Juglans
- Section: Juglans sect. Rhysocaryon
- Species: J. australis

Binomial name
- Juglans australis Griseb.

Synonyms
- Juglans brasiliensis Dode

= Juglans australis =

Species of tree

Juglans australis, the nogal criollo, is a species of plant in the Juglandaceae family. This large, fast-growing tree can grow to 20 m (66 ft) tall at elevations of 0.5–1.5 km (1,600–4,900 ft) in the Southern Andean Yungas, montane cloud forests on the eastern slopes of the Andes in Tucumán, Salta, and Jujuy provinces of Argentina and Tarija and Chuquisaca departments of Bolivia. It is threatened by habitat loss.

== Description ==
J. australis is a spreading deciduous tree, up to 25 m (82 ft) wide which produces first quality lumber, with a straight trunk up to 6 m (20 ft) tall and up to 5 dm (20 in) in diameter. The wood is dense (640 kg/m^{3}), hard, and strong. Upon drying, the radial shrinkage is 2.2%, the tangential 4.7%. The pinnately compound leaves are borne alternately, and bear up to fifteen oval-lanceolate finely serrate leaflets.

Like most walnuts, J. australis produces juglone, an allelopathic substance which decreases competition from other plants growing nearby.

It is more frost resistant than the Persian walnut (J. regia).

== Uses ==
The immature fruits are pickled whole for human consumption. The mature nuts are also eaten. The concentrated extract of the husk is used as a vermifuge.
