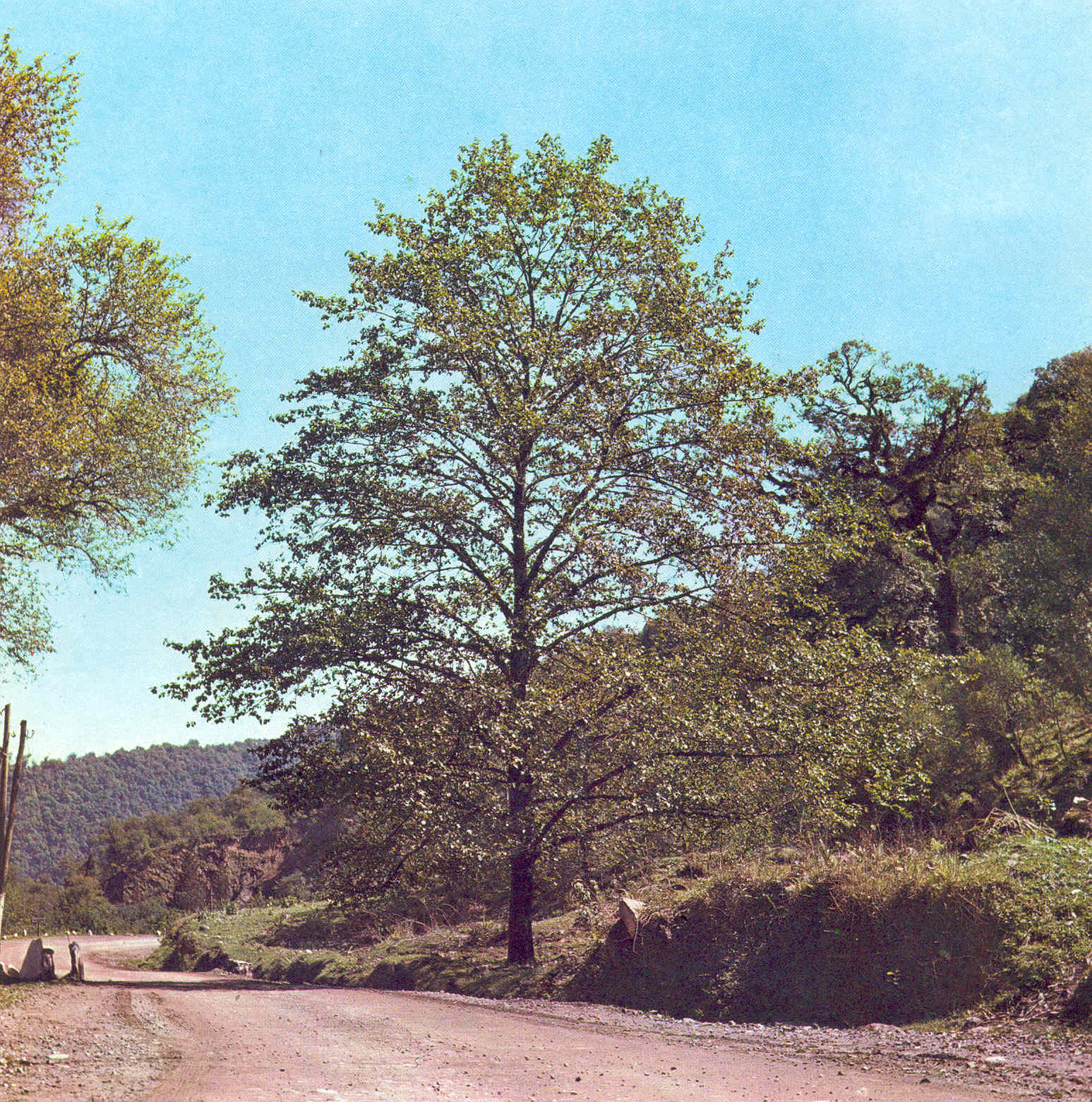

Conservation status
- Least Concern (IUCN 3.1)

Scientific classification
- Kingdom: Plantae
- Clade: Tracheophytes
- Clade: Angiosperms
- Clade: Eudicots
- Clade: Rosids
- Order: Fagales
- Family: Betulaceae
- Genus: Alnus
- Species: A. acuminata

Binomial name
- Alnus acuminata Kunth

Synonyms
- Betula arguta Schltdl.; Alnus arguta (Schltdl.) Spach; Alnus pringlei Fernald; Alnus ovalifolia Bartlett; Alnus guatemalensis Gand.; Alnus glabrata Fernald

= Alnus acuminata =

Species of tree

Alnus acuminata is a species of deciduous tree in the Betulaceae family. It is found in montane forests from central Mexico to Argentina.

== Description ==
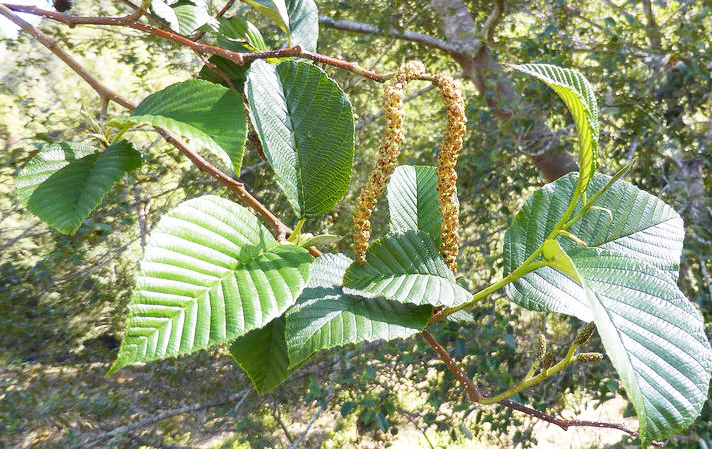
Leaves and male inflorescences of Alnus acuminata

Alnus acuminata grows up to 25 metres (80 ft) tall with a straight trunk up to 150 centimetres (60 in) thick. The bark has many yellowish lenticels. The leaves are simple, oval with toothed margins. The inflorescences are catkins, separate male and female flowers on the same tree. The male flowers are up to 12 cm (5 in) long and pendulous, while the smaller female flowers are green, erect and resemble a small cone. After wind fertilisation, the female flowers develop into 2 cm (0.8 in) long dehiscent, woody brown fruits. There are 80 to 100 winged seeds per fruit, and these are liberated when ripe, leaving the dried out fruit husks on the tree.

There are three subspecies: Alnus acuminata subsp. acuminata occurs from Colombia and Venezuela south to northern Argentina; Alnus acuminata subsp. arguta (Schltdl.) Furlow occurs from northwestern Mexico south to Panama; and Alnus acuminata subsp. glabrata (Fernald) Furlow occurs in central and southern Mexico.

== Distribution and habitat ==
Alnus acuminata grows at altitudes between 1,500 and 3,200 metres (4,900 and 10,500 ft) in the mountain ranges in tropical Central and South America from Mexico to northern Argentina. It mostly grows on areas with 1000–3000 mm of rainfall, on slopes and valleys. It tolerates poor soils and acid conditions, but prefers silt or sandy silt soils. It is a fast-growing tree, a pioneer species used for watershed protection and can be used for soil improvement because it has root nodules that fix nitrogen.

A. acuminata demonstrates a capacity to thrive in disturbed or ecologically challenging environments. Its adaptability to infertile soils is attributed to its ability to establish both ectomycorrhizal and actinorhizal relationships. Recognized for its rapid growth, this species plays a pivotal role in enhancing soil fertility by augmenting soil organic matter, nitrogen levels, and cation-exchange capacity.

Given the many advantages that A. acuminata offers, the species has gained popularity in agroforestry. Farmers with an average of 130–161 Alnus trees per hectare found benefits in their contributions to carbon sequestration, a reduction of soil erosion and increased soil fertility according to a study done in northwest Rwanda. Providing resources needed for daily living in the region, such as firewood, lumber, and stakes for climbing bean trees, is a further benefit.

== Timber ==
The timber is light to mid reddish-brown and fine grained. It is used for building bridges and pilings, for making coffins, boxes, crates, furniture and plywood. It also makes a good firewood that burns steadily.

== Medical Usage ==
Alnus acuminata has been used traditionally in Central and South American medicine to treat acute inflammation. To evaluate the effectiveness of the anti-inflammatory claims and ascertain whether the substance is safe and non-toxic, researchers performed phenolic analyses. The stem bark has been found to contain triterpenoids and diarylheptanoids, indicating that it is anti-inflammatory and is safe for ingestion.
