= Zero footprint =

Zero footprint may refer to:

- Zero Footprint Applications
- Absence of ecological footprint
- Zerofootprint Private Company
