= Mossom Creek Hatchery =

Salmon hatchery in Port Moody, British Columbia

Coordinates: 49.3056533°N 122.8596954°W

Mossom Creek Hatchery is a salmon hatchery in Port Moody, British Columbia. It is a salmon enhancement project supported by Fisheries and Oceans Canada. It was started in 1976 by high school volunteers from local Centennial School in Coquitlam and teachers Ruth Foster and Rod MacVicar. They formed the Centennial School Salmon project, which is still an active club at the school. It has received much recognition for its unique and longstanding work. Ruth Foster has won a Canadian Environment Award for her work at Mossom Creek Hatchery.

When the hatchery began, there were no salmon left in Mossom Creek. Thanks to the efforts of volunteers over the decades there is now a strong run of chum salmon and an increasing run of coho salmon. The hatchery also supplies fish to other streams that drain into Burrard Inlet. By reintroducing these salmon, the hatchery strengthens the surrounding ecosystem at various trophic levels. Every year the hatchery releases approximately 100,000 chum fry into the area and approximately 7,000 coho smolts.

The hatchery is operated by Burrard Inlet Marine Enhancement Society, a non-profit group, and relies on volunteers year round. They also work closely with other organizations such as the Pacific WildLife Foundation and the Port Moody Ecological Society. Eggs and milt are collected from chum and coho salmon in the fall and early winter from Mossom Creek, Noons Creek (in cooperation with the Port Moody Ecological Society), and sometimes other river systems such as the Indian River. The eggs are fertilized and placed in stacked incubators until they hatch. During the winter, eggs hatch into alevins which absorb their yolk sacks to become fry. Chum are released into the streams as large fry in the spring. Coho smolts that are a year old are also released, as the coho fry must spend an extra year in the hatchery's large rearing tubs.

Mossom Creek has been an absolutely pristine creek, and it is home to several other species of wildlife such as the coastal tailed frog and the American dipper. Black-tailed deer, black bear and bobcat also make their home within the watershed forest. Recently, upstream development on steep slopes in the Village of Anmore, has impacted the stream with heavy siltation. Much volunteer time has been directed at documenting and dealing with this issue. Another recent effect of upstream development can be seen in recent water quality tests. These tests indicate that the levels of phosphates and nitrates have recently reached a detectable level.

Mossom Creek Hatchery has achieved the "Accessibility Certified Gold" rating under the Rick Hansen foundation Accessibility Certification (RHFAC) Achieving a score of 84 out of 100 points.
