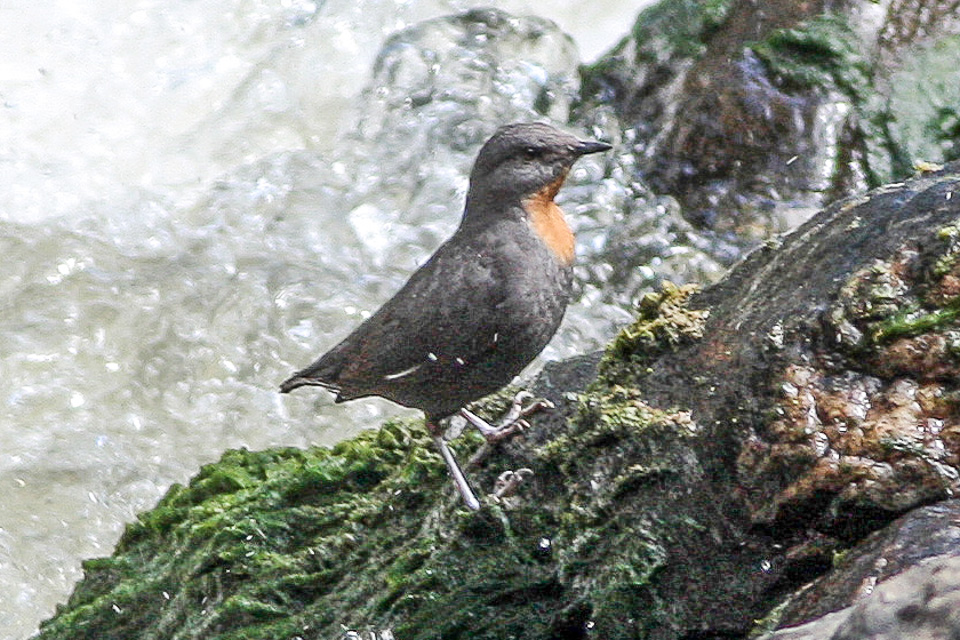

Conservation status
- Vulnerable (IUCN 3.1)

Scientific classification
- Kingdom: Animalia
- Phylum: Chordata
- Class: Aves
- Order: Passeriformes
- Family: Cinclidae
- Genus: Cinclus
- Species: C. schulzii

Binomial name
- Cinclus schulzii Cabanis, 1882
- Distribution map

= Rufous-throated dipper =

Species of bird

The rufous-throated dipper or Argentine dipper (Cinclus schulzii) is a Vulnerable species of semiaquatic songbird of South America. It is found in Argentina and Bolivia.

== Taxonomy and systematics ==
The rufous-throated dipper was described by the German ornithologist Jean Cabanis in 1882 and given the binomial Cinclus schulzii. The type locality is the mountain of Cerro Bayo in northern Argentina. The specific epithet schulzii was chosen to honor the German zoologist Friedrich W. Schulz (1866-1933) who had collected the type specimen. Various authors have misspelled the specific epithet as schulzi and schultzi. Of the five species now placed in the genus, a molecular genetic study has shown that the rufous-throated dipper is most closely related to the other South American species, the white-capped dipper (Cinclus leucocephalus).

The rufous-throated dipper is monotypic.

== Description ==
The rufous-throated dipper is 14 to 15.5 cm (5.5 to 6.1 in) long and weighs about 40 g (1.4 oz). The sexes have the same plumage, but males are slightly larger than females. Adults have a dark brownish gray head and upperparts. Their wings and tail are slightly darker. The wing's primaries' upper surfaces have white bases on their inner webs that only show when the wing is open. Their wing's underside has a wide white band at the base of the primaries. Their chin is grayish and their throat and upper breast orange-rufous. Their underparts are gray brown that is grayer on the breast and darker on the belly. They have a dark brown to blackish iris, a black to dark gray bill, and lead-gray legs and feet. Juveniles are similar to adults but paler and with a pinkish bill.

== Distribution and habitat ==
The rufous-throated dipper is found on the east side of the Andes from southern Chuquisaca and western Tarija departments in southern Bolivia south into northwestern Argentina to Catamarca and Tucumán provinces. It is a bird of rocky fast-flowing mountain streams and rivers. It favors waterways that are about 5 to 15 m (15 to 50 ft) wide that flow between cliffs or rocky banks and have cascades and waterfalls. It very seldom is found on narrower streams in forest. In elevation it mostly ranges between 1,500 and 2,500 m (4,900 and 8,200 ft) though it has been observed higher and is known to sometimes descend to about 800 m (2,600 ft) in very cold weather. A dominant tree in its primary elevation zone is the Andean alder (Alnus acuminata).

== Behavior ==
=== Movement ===
The rufous-throated dipper is mostly a year-round resident but makes some elevational movements in cold weather.

=== Feeding ===
The rufous-throated dipper feeds on larval and adult aquatic insects. It forages while wading in shallow water, while standing on wet rocks, and by probing into moss and other vegetation on the bank. It occasionally takes insects in mid-air with a jump or short sally. It often catches prey with its head and body mostly submerged but does not dive or go completely underwater. It makes only short flights between feeding sites.

=== Breeding ===
The rufous-throated dipper's breeding season has not been fully defined but includes the September to January span. Its nest is a large globe with a side entrance, made from moss and grass lined with grass, other vegetation, and sometimes feathers and human-made materials. Nests have been found in crevices and on ledges of cliffs, in niches in a rock wall, on an earthen bank under an overhang, on tree roots, and within brickwork on a bridge. They were within about 0.5 and 1.25 m (2 and 4 ft) of the water. Pairs typically have a territory 0.5 to 1 km (0.3 to 0.6 mi) along the watercourse but territories up to 2 km (1.2 mi) are known. The clutch size is two eggs. The incubation period, time to fledging, and details of parental care are not known.

=== Vocalization ===
As of March 2026 xeno-canto had five recordings of rufous-throated dipper vocalizations; the Cornell Lab's Macaulay Library had 12 with some overlap. The species' song is "a loud melodious warbling or trilling" that is similar to that of the white-throated dipper, (C. cinclus). Its calls include "a loud zzit or dzchit or schenk"; they are usually given in a series and with a faster pace when in flight.

== Status ==
The IUCN originally in 1988 assessed the rufous-throated dipper as Threatened and since 1994 as Vulnerable. It has a limited range and its estimated population of between 2000 and 3300 mature individuals is believed to be decreasing. "Reservoir construction, hydroelectric and irrigation schemes and eutrophication threaten riverine habitats. Pollution from mining and industrial effluents, reduced flows, river channel modifications and loss of riparian forests for agricultural conversion are prevalent in parts of the range." However, "[m]uch habitat however remains largely inaccessible". It is considered uncommon to locally common and is found in several protected areas in Argentina and at least one in Bolivia.
