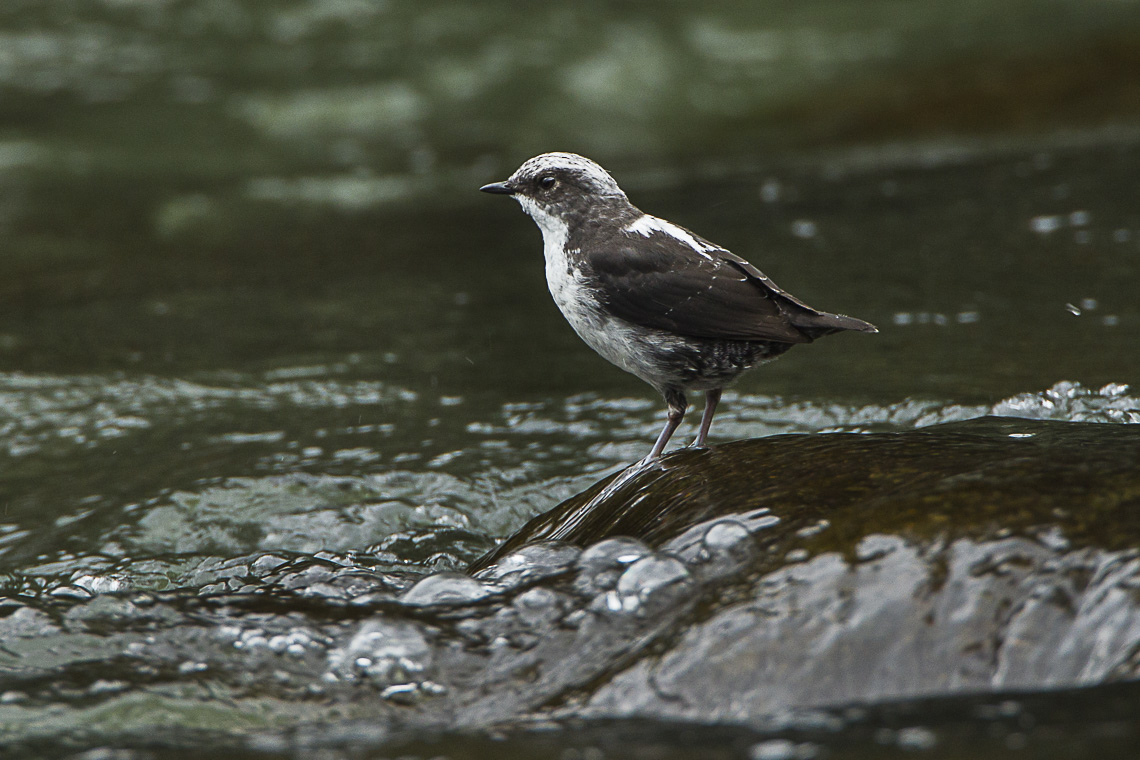
- Subspecies Cinclus leucocephalus leuconotus

Conservation status
- Least Concern (IUCN 3.1)

Scientific classification
- Kingdom: Animalia
- Phylum: Chordata
- Class: Aves
- Order: Passeriformes
- Family: Cinclidae
- Genus: Cinclus
- Species: C. leucocephalus

Binomial name
- Cinclus leucocephalus Tschudi, 1844
- Distribution map

= White-capped dipper =

Species of bird

The white-capped dipper (Cinclus leucocephalus) is a semiaquatic passerine bird of South America. It is found in Bolivia, Colombia, Ecuador, Peru, and Venezuela.

== Taxonomy and systematics ==
The white-capped dipper was described by the Swiss naturalist Johann Jakob von Tschudi in 1844 with the binomial Cinclus leucocephalus, which it has retained ever since. The type locality is the Junín Province in Peru. The specific epithet leucocephalus combines the Ancient Greek leukos "white" and -kephalos "-headed". Of the five species now placed in the genus, a molecular genetic study has shown that the white-capped dipper is most closely related to the other South American species, the rufous-throated dipper (Cinclus schulzii).

The white-capped dipper has these three subspecies:

- C. l. rivularis Bangs, 1899
- C. l. leuconotus Sclater, PL, 1858
- C. l. leucocephalus Tschudi, 1844

== Description ==
The white-capped dipper is 13.5 to 16.5 cm (5.3 to 6.5 in) long and weighs 38 to 59 g (1.3 to 2.1 oz). The sexes have the same plumage, but males are slightly larger than females. Adults of the nominate subspecies C. l. leucocephalus have a white crown and nape that sometimes have blackish brown streaks. The rest of their face is sooty brown with white eyelids. The sooty brown continues onto their blackish brown upperparts and tail. Their wings are mostly blackish brown with white inner webs on the secondaries. Their chin, throat, and upper breast are white and the rest of their underparts blackish brown. Subspecies C. l. leuconotus is similar to the nominate but with a large white patch on its upper back and the white of its underparts extending through the belly. C. l. rivularis is mostly paler and grayer than the nominate. Its crown and nape are like the nominate's. Its throat is white, sometimes with gray spots, and the white does not extend onto the breast. Its underparts have variable amounts of white from a few speckles to many spots. All subspecies have a brown iris, a black bill, and bluish gray legs and feet.

== Distribution and habitat ==
Subspecies C. l. rivularis of the white-capped dipper is found in the isolated Sierra Nevada de Santa Marta in northern Colombia. Subspecies C. l. leuconotus is found in the Serranía del Perijá on the Colombia-Venezuela border and in the Andes from the Lara-Trujillo border in western Venezuela south through all three Colombian Andes ranges and both slopes of the Andes of Ecuador into northern Peru as far as central Amazonas and San Martín departments. The nominate subspecies is found from northern Amazonas in Peru south into northwestern Bolivia to western Santa Cruz Department. It is found on the eastern Andean slope for the length of Peru but only locally on the western slope.

The white-capped dipper is a bird of rocky fast-flowing mountain streams. It favors streams with clear water and often those flowing through rocky outcrops or cliffs. Many of its waterways flow through forest but at higher elevations flow through more open landscapes. In Venezuela it ranges in elevation between 2,000 and 2,600 m (6,600 and 8,500 ft) with sight records as low as 1,600 m (5,200 ft) and as high as 3,000 m (9,800 ft). In Colombia it ranges between 500 and 4,000 m (1,600 and 13,100 ft) and in Ecuador mostly between 700 and 3,800 m (2,300 and 12,500 ft). In Peru it ranges mostly between 1,500 and 3,100 m (4,900 and 10,200 ft) but is found locally as low as 900 m (3,000 ft) and as high as 4,200 m (13,800 ft).

== Behavior ==
=== Movement ===
The white-capped dipper is mostly a year-round resident but may make some elevational movements in the non-breeding season.

=== Feeding ===
The white-capped dipper feeds primarily on aquatic invertebrates such as the larvae of blackflies (Simuliidae) and caddis-flies (Trichoptera) and the nymphs of mayflies (Ephemeroptera). It also includes much smaller amounts of worms and small fish in its diet. It forages singly or in pairs along the edges of streams, while wading or swimming in them, and while walking on submerged rocks. It does not dive like other dippers but dips its head underwater to capture prey.

=== Breeding ===
The white-capped dipper's breeding season has not been fully defined but includes February and March in Venezuela. It could span as long as February to September in Colombia, at least August to December in Ecuador, and at least September to December in Peru. It makes a domed nest with a side entrance from moss and rootlets with a bed of dry vegetation on the floor. It is typically placed on a rock face near a stream in a crack or cavity or on a ledge. Some are placed behind waterfalls. Eight nests ranged between 1.2 and 3.5 m (4 and 11 ft) above water. The clutch is one or two eggs. The incubation period is believed to be at least 14 days and fledging occurs at least 21 days after hatch. Both parents provision nestlings.

=== Vocalization ===
The white-capped dipper's song has been described as "a prolonged loud trill". A more detailed description is "a loud, varied warbling with some harsh phrases; remarkably audible over the rushing sound of water". Its call, usually given in flight and heard above the water noise, is "a loud, buzzy str'e'e'e'e'd (or zre'e'e'e'e'd), like high-voltage electricity".

== Status ==
The IUCN has assessed the white-capped dipper as being of Least Concern. It has a very large range; its population size is not known but is believed to be stable. No immediate threats have been identified. It is considered fairly common in Venezuela, locally common in Colombia, widespread on the east side of the Peruvian Andes, and local on the west side. "Due to its reliance on streams, the White-capped Dipper is sensitive to water pollution."
