= Ron Dembo =

South African risk management expert

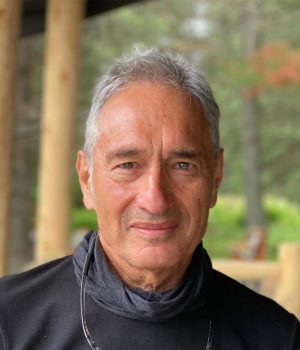
Dr. Ron Dembo, 2021

Ron Samuel Dembo is an academic and entrepreneur. He served as a professor at Yale University. During this time, he held joint appointments in both the Department of Computer Science and the School of Management. He co-authored three Technical Reports at Yale's Dept. of Computer Science in 1984.

== Career ==
Dembo was founder and CEO of Algorithmics Incorporated. Algorithmics was sold to Fitch in 2005 and later to IBM in 2012. It has since been acquired by SS&C.

In 2005, Dembo founded Zerofootprint Software, a Toronto-based, cleantech software and services company. In the same year, he founded the non-profit Zerofootprint Foundation which won gold in the Climate Change category at the Canadian Environment Awards in 2008.

== Awards and honors ==
In May 2007, Dembo was made a lifetime Fields Institute Fellow. This fellowship is awarded to "individuals who have made outstanding contributions to the Fields Institute," its programs, and to the Canadian mathematical community. Dembo's alma mater, the University of Waterloo, honored Dembo with a Distinguished Alumni Achievement Medal for Professional Achievement in business and climate change in 2007.

In 2009 and 2010, Dembo participated in the Steering Committee of the World Urban Campaign, as coordinated by UN Habitat, in Barcelona, Paris, and Rio de Janeiro. In 2024, Zerofootprint remains a Partner in the Business and Industries Constituency of the World Urban Campaign by UN Habitat.

== Books ==
Dembo is the author of Seeing Tomorrow: Rewriting the Rules of Risk, co-authored with Andrew Freeman, published in April 1998; Upside Downside: Simple Rules of Risk Management for the Smart Investor, co-authored with Daniel Stoffman, published in March 2006; and Risk Thinking, published in 2021.
