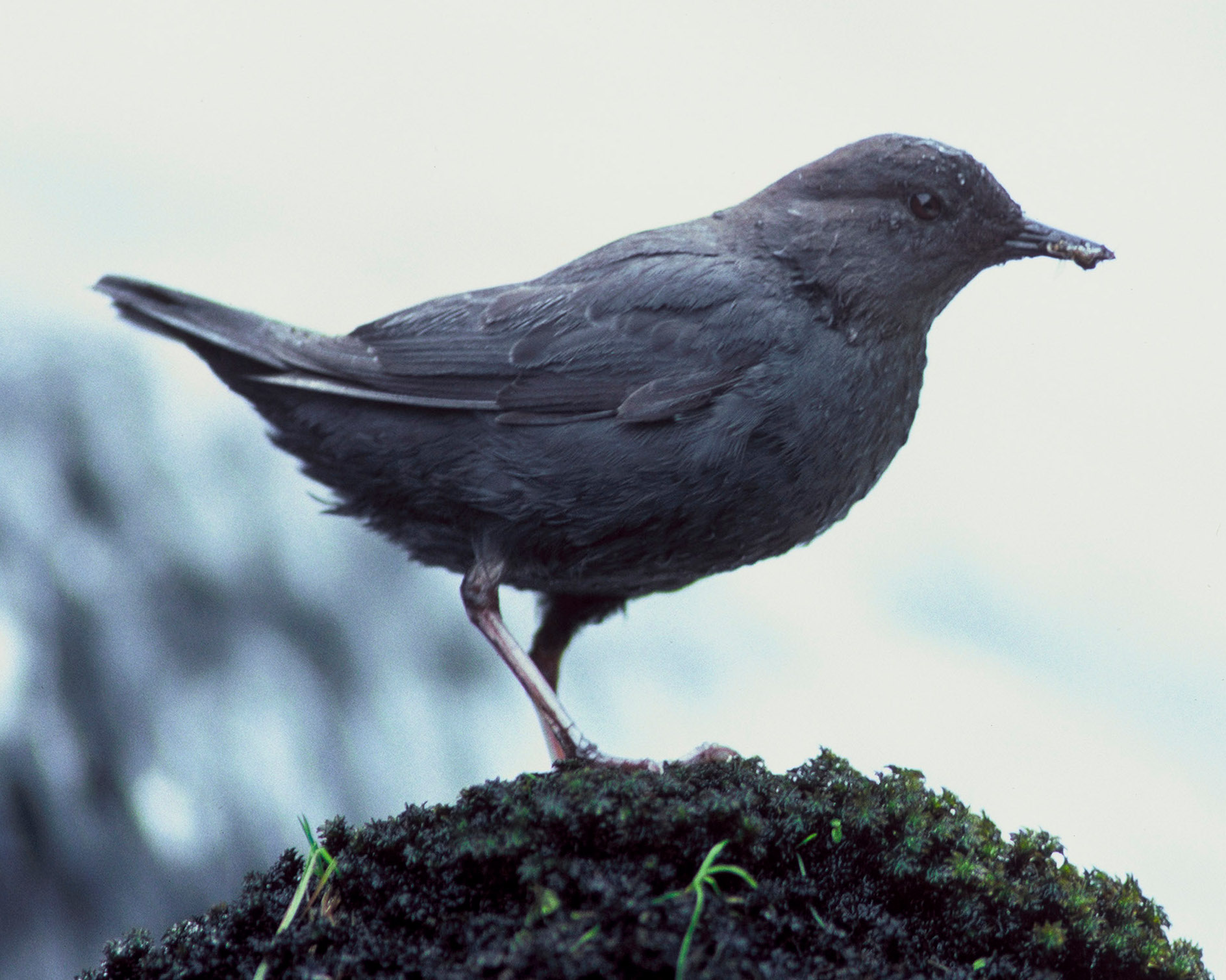
- American dipper (Cinclus mexicanus)

Scientific classification
- Kingdom: Animalia
- Phylum: Chordata
- Class: Aves
- Order: Passeriformes
- Superfamily: Muscicapoidea
- Family: Cinclidae; Sundevall, 1836
- Genus: Cinclus; Borkhausen, 1797

Type species
- Cinclus hydrophilus Borkhausen, 1797
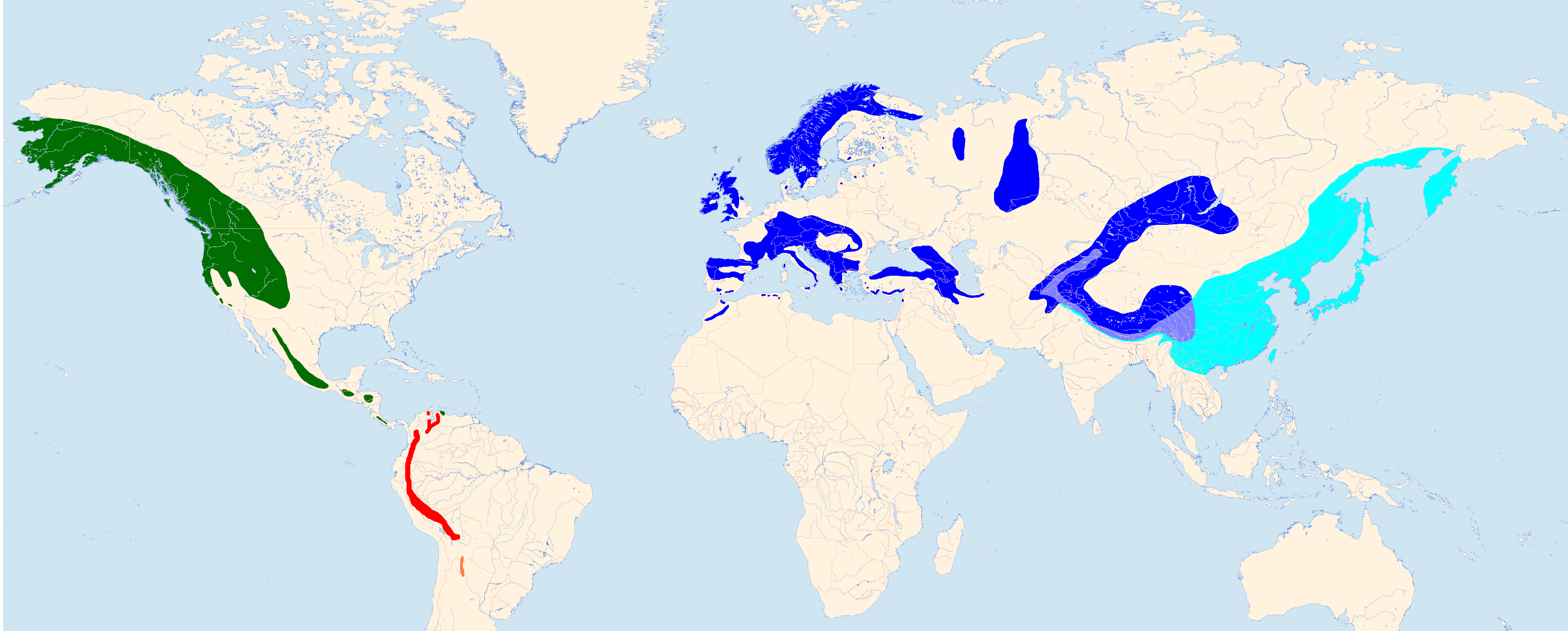
- Distribution map White-throated dipper Brown dipper American dipper White-capped dipper Rufous-throated dipper

= Dipper =

Dippers

Genus of birds

- - Turdidae
  - Cinclidae
    - - white-throated dipper
      - brown dipper
    - - American dipper
      - - white-capped dipper
        - rufous-throated dipper

Phylogeny of the dippers

Dippers are members of the genus Cinclus in the bird family Cinclidae, so-called because of their bobbing or dipping movements. They are unique among passerines for their ability to dive and swim underwater.

== Taxonomy ==
The genus Cinclus was introduced by the German naturalist Moritz Balthasar Borkhausen in 1797 with the white-throated dipper (Cinclus cinclus) as the type species. The name cinclus is from the Ancient Greek word kinklos that was used to describe small tail-wagging birds that resided near water.

Cinclus is the only genus in the family Cinclidae. The white-throated dipper and American dipper are also known in Britain and America, respectively, as the water ouzel (sometimes spelt "ousel") – ouzel originally meant the only distantly related but superficially similar Eurasian blackbird (Old English osle). Ouzel also survives as the name of a relative of the blackbird, the ring ouzel.

The genus contains the following five species:

Image	Common name	Scientific name	Distribution
	White-throated dipper or European dipper	Cinclus cinclus	Europe, the Middle East, Central Asia, and the Indian subcontinent
	Brown dipper	Cinclus pallasii	Mountains of the east Palearctic
	American dipper	Cinclus mexicanus	Mountainous regions of North America from Alaska to Panama
	White-capped dipper	Cinclus leucocephalus	Bolivia, Colombia, Ecuador, Peru, and Venezuela
	Rufous-throated dipper	Cinclus schulzii	Argentina and Bolivia

A 2002 molecular phylogenetic study of the dippers looked at the DNA sequences of two mitochondrial genes. It found that the Eurasian white-throated dipper and brown dipper are sister species as are the South American white-capped dipper and rufous-throated dipper. The study also showed that the dipper family, Cinclidae, is most closely related to the thrush family, Turdidae.

== Description ==
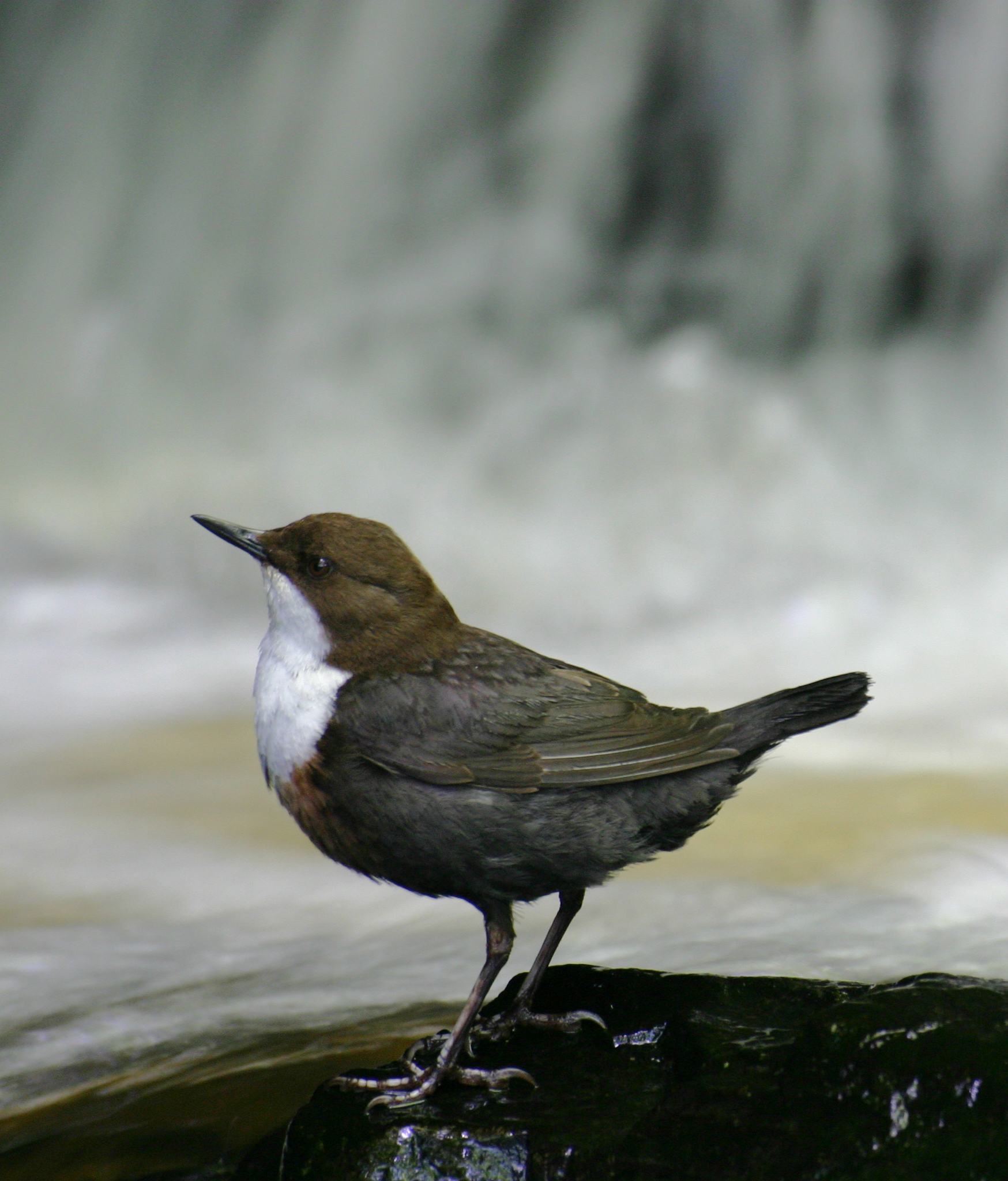
White-throated dipper (C. cinclus)

Dippers are small, chunky, stout, short-tailed, short-winged, strong-legged birds. The different species are generally dark brown (sometimes nearly black), or brown and white in colour, apart from the rufous-throated dipper, which is brown with a reddish-brown throat patch. Sizes range from 14–22 cm (5.5–8.7 in) in length and 40–90 g (1.4–3.2 oz) in weight, with males larger than females. Their short wings give them a distinctive whirring flight. They have a characteristic bobbing motion when perched beside the water, giving them their name. While under water, they are covered by a thin, silvery film of air, due to small bubbles being trapped on the surface of the plumage.

== Distribution and habitat ==
Dippers are found in suitable freshwater habitats in the highlands of the Americas, Europe and Asia. In Africa they are only found in the Atlas Mountains of Morocco. They inhabit the banks of fast-moving upland rivers with cold, clear waters, though, outside the breeding season, they may visit lake shores and sea coasts.

== Adaptations ==
Unlike many water birds, dippers are generally similar in form to many terrestrial birds (for example, they do not have webbed feet), but they do have some morphological and physiological adaptations to their aquatic habits. They have evolved solid bones to reduce their buoyancy, and their wings are relatively short but strongly muscled, enabling them to be used as flippers underwater. The plumage is dense, with a large preen gland for waterproofing their feathers. Relatively long legs and sharp claws enable them to hold on to rocks in swift water. Their eyes have well-developed focus muscles that can change the curvature of the lens to enhance underwater vision. They have nasal flaps to prevent water entering their nostrils.

The high haemoglobin concentration in their blood gives them a capacity to store oxygen greater than that of other birds, allowing them to remain underwater for 30 seconds or more, whilst their basal metabolic rate is approximately one-third slower than typical terrestrial passerines of similar mass. One small population wintering at a hot spring in Suntar-Khayata Mountains of Siberia feeds underwater when air temperatures drop below −55 °C (−67 °F).

== Behaviour ==
=== Food ===
Dippers forage for small animal prey in and along the margins of fast-flowing freshwater streams and rivers. They perch on rocks and feed at the edge of the water, but they often also grip the rocks firmly and walk down them beneath the water until partly or wholly submerged. They then search underwater for prey between and beneath stones and debris; they can also swim with their wings. The two South American species swim and dive less often than the three northern ones. Their prey consists primarily of invertebrates such as the nymphs or larvae of mayflies, blackflies, stoneflies and caddisflies, as well as small fish and fish eggs. Molluscs and crustaceans are also consumed, especially in winter when insect larvae are less available.

=== Breeding ===
Linear breeding territories are established by pairs of dippers along suitable rivers, and maintained against incursion by other dippers. Within their territory the pair must have a good nest site and roost sites, but the main factor affecting the length of the territory is the availability of sufficient food to feed themselves and their broods. Consequently, the length of a territory may vary from about 300 metres (1,000 feet) to over 2,500 metres (8,200 feet).

Dipper nests are usually large, round, domed structures made of moss, with an internal cup of grass and rootlets, and a side entrance hole. They are often built in confined spaces over, or close to, running water. The site may be on a ledge or bank, in a crevice or drainpipe, or beneath a bridge. Tree sites are rare.

The usual clutch-size of the three northern dipper species is four or five; those of the South American species is not well known, though some evidence suggests that of the rufous-throated dipper is two. The incubation period of 16 or 17 days is followed by the hatching of altricial young which are brooded by the female alone for the next 12 to 13 days. The nestlings are fed by both parents and the whole fledging period is about 20–24 days. Young dippers usually become independent of their parents within a couple of weeks of leaving the nest. Dippers may raise second broods if conditions allow. The maximum recorded age from ring-recovery data of a white-throated dipper is 10 years and 7 months for a bird ringed in Finland. The maximum age for an American dipper is 8 years and 1 month for a bird ringed and recovered in South Dakota.

=== Communication ===
Dippers' calls are loud and high-pitched, being similar to calls made by other birds on fast rivers; the call frequencies lying within a narrow range of 4.0–6.5 kHz, well above the torrent noise frequency of maximum 2 kHz. Dippers also communicate visually by their characteristic dipping or bobbing movements, as well as by blinking rapidly to expose the white feathers on their upper eyelids as a series of white flashes in courtship and threat displays.

== Conservation ==
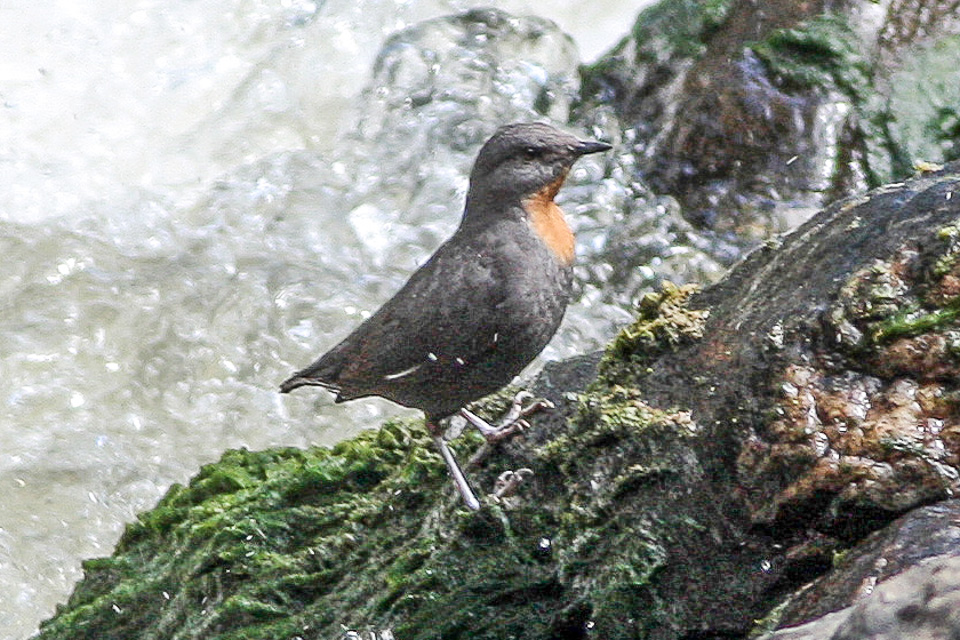
The rufous-throated dipper is considered Vulnerable by the IUCN

Dippers are completely dependent on fast-flowing rivers with clear water, accessible food and secure nest-sites. They may be threatened by anything that affects these needs such as water pollution, acidification and turbidity caused by erosion. River regulation through the creation of dams and reservoirs, as well as channelization, can degrade and destroy dipper habitat.

Dippers are also sometimes hunted or otherwise persecuted by humans for various reasons. The Cyprus race of the white-throated dipper is extinct. In the Atlas Mountains dippers are claimed to have aphrodisiacal properties. In parts of Scotland and Germany, until the beginning of the 20th century, bounties were paid for killing dippers because of a misguided perception that they were detrimental to fish stocks through predation on the eggs and fry of salmonids.

Despite threats to local populations, the conservation status of most dipper species is considered to be of least concern. The one exception, the rufous-throated dipper, is classified as vulnerable because of its small, fragmented and declining population which is threatened, especially in Argentina, by changes in river management.
