= Maisie Shiell =

Canadian activist (1916–2008)

Maisie Shiell (1916–2008) was a Canadian activist.

Shiell became involved in anti-nuclear issues in 1976 when public concern developed about a new uranium mine in Saskatchewan. At sixty-one years of age, Shiell began learning how to translate highly technical issues about radioactivity into something she could understand and pass along to other lay people.

In 2002, Shiell received the Saskatchewan Eco-Network award for Environmentalist of the Year and also shared the Lifetime Achievement Award given by the Canadian Environmental Network. In 2004, the Canadian Environment Awards honored her with another prize. Shiell was internationally recognized in 1998 when she received the first Lifetime Achievement prize from the Munich-based Nuclear-Free Future Award.

In May 2008, Shiell died at her Saskatoon home, aged 92.

== See also ==
- Anti-nuclear movement in Canada
