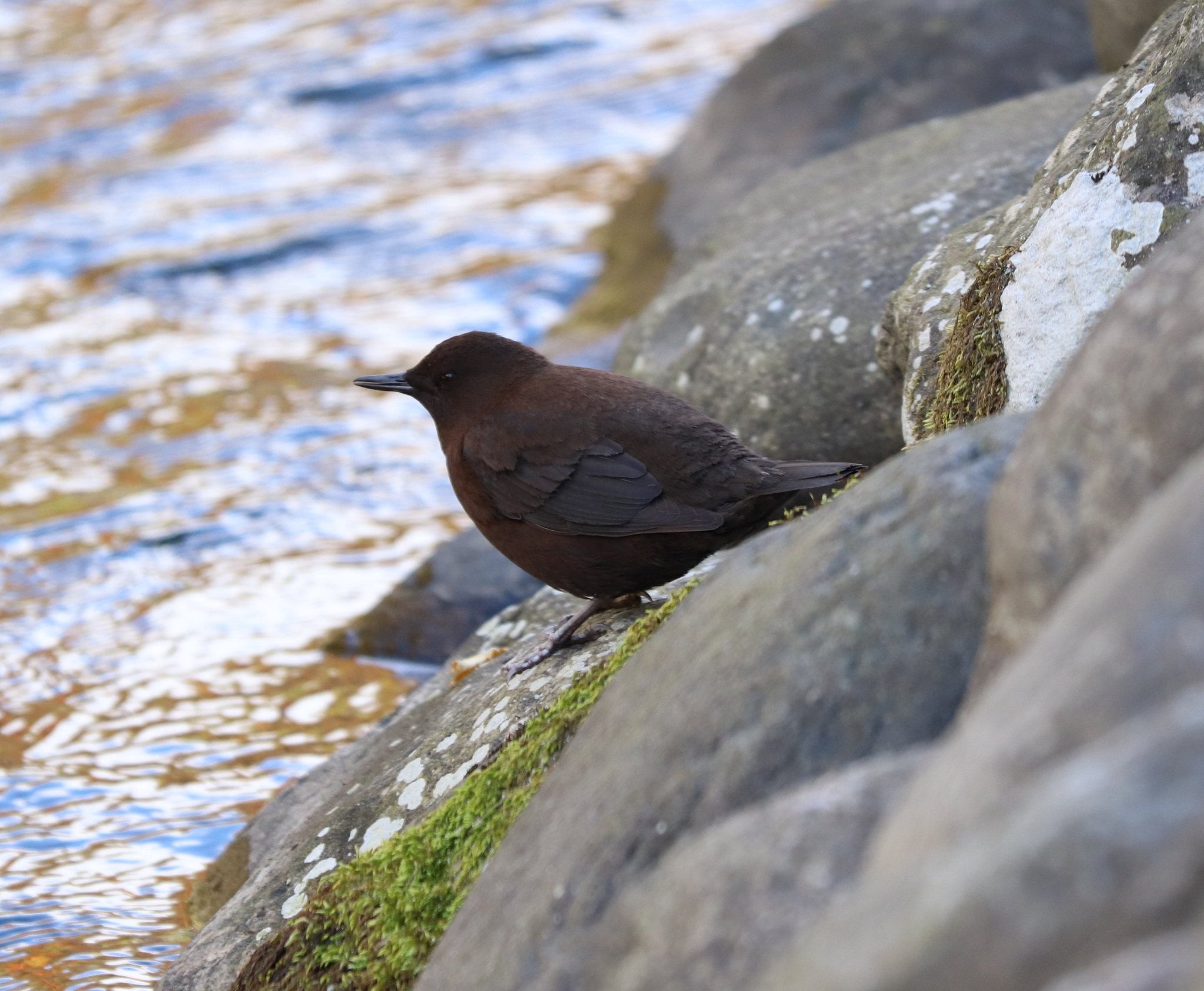

Conservation status
- Least Concern (IUCN 3.1)

Scientific classification
- Kingdom: Animalia
- Phylum: Chordata
- Class: Aves
- Order: Passeriformes
- Family: Cinclidae
- Genus: Cinclus
- Species: C. pallasii

Binomial name
- Cinclus pallasii Temminck, 1820
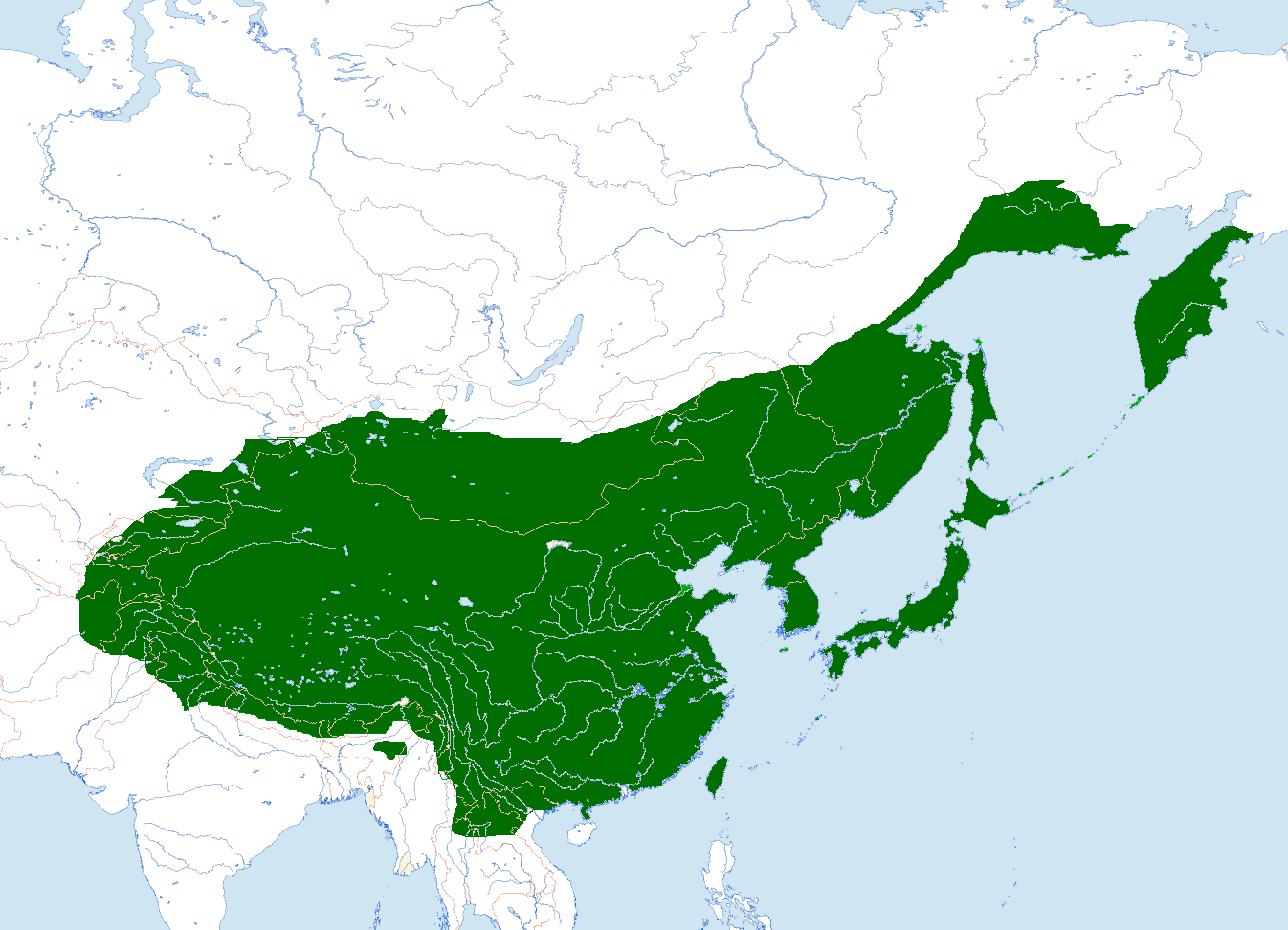
- Distribution map

= Brown dipper =

Species of bird

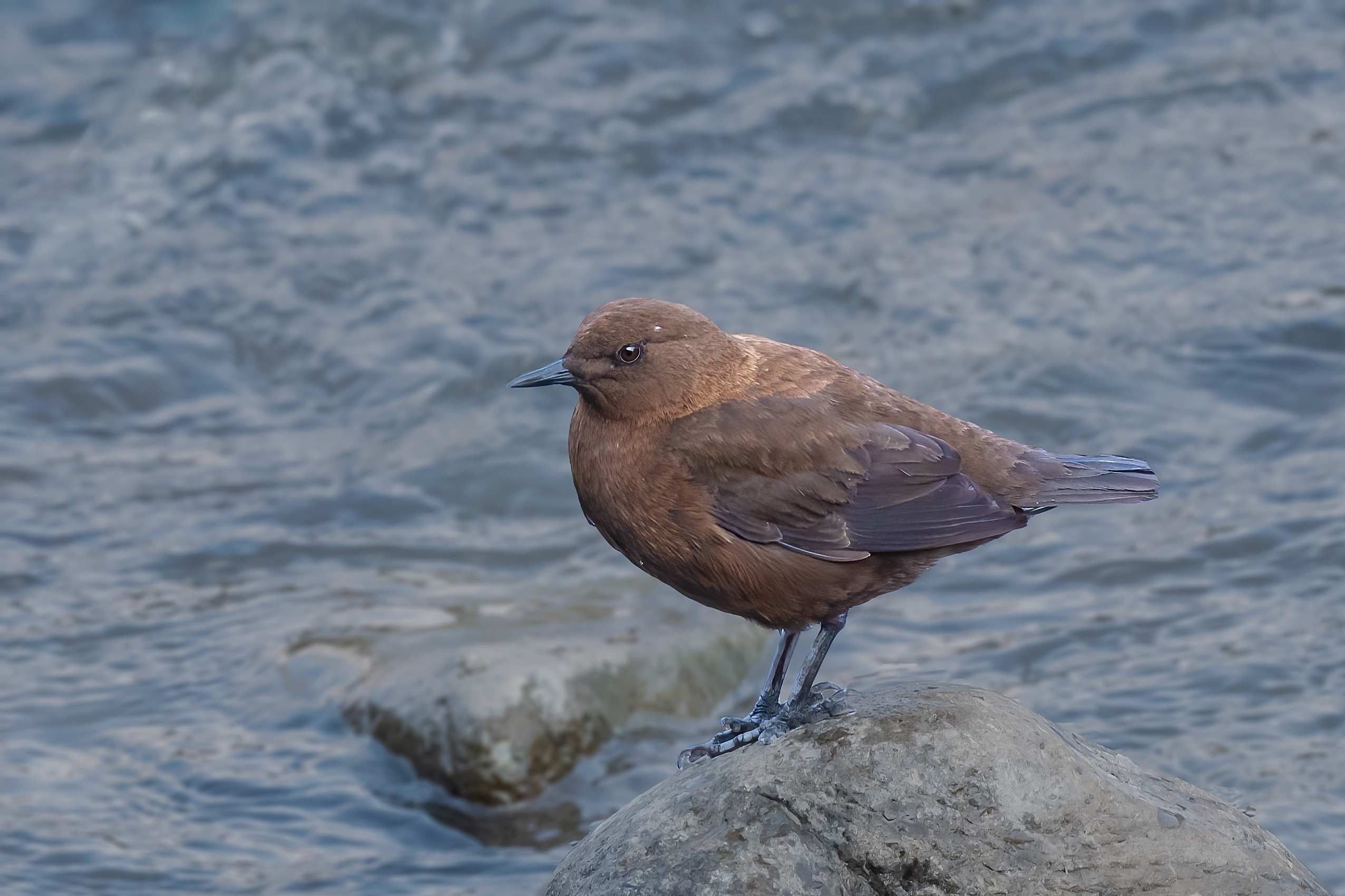
Brown Dipper, Pahalgam, Anantnag, Jammu and Kashmir

The brown dipper (Cinclus pallasii), also known as Pallas's dipper, Asian dipper or the Asiatic dipper, is an aquatic songbird found in the mountains of the east Palearctic. It is a thrush-like bird with a cocked tail. Its plumage is chocolate-brown with a slightly lighter coloured back and breast. At 22 cm (8.7 in) and 87 g (3.1 oz), it is the largest of the dippers. This species, which is not often seen, is found at medium to low elevations where mountain streams flow.

== Taxonomy ==
The brown dipper was described by the Dutch zoologist Coenraad Jacob Temminck in 1820 and given the binomial name Cinclus pallasii. The type locality is Eastern Siberia. The specific epithet pallasii was chosen in honour of the Prussian naturalist Peter Simon Pallas (1741–1811). Of the five species now placed in the genus, a molecular genetic study has shown that the brown dipper is most closely related to the other Eurasian species, the white-throated dipper (Cinclus cinclus).

There are three subspecies:

- C. p. tenuirostris Bonaparte, 1850 – north Afghanistan and the mountains of central Asia to central Himalayas
- C. p. dorjei Kinnear, 1937 – east Himalayas to Myanmar and northwest Thailand
- C. p. pallasii Temminck, 1820 – east Siberia to central China east to island of Sakhalin, Kuril Islands, Japan and Taiwan, south to south China, north Indochina

== Diet and feeding biology ==
The brown dipper can either feed by diving into streams to eat larger benthic organisms, or wade in shallower parts of streams and pick smaller organisms of the bottom. The adults will dive for food from December through April, which is when there are more large benthic organisms. Since this period is also the breeding season of the brown dipper, more food is required, so diving for large food is necessary. However, the adults will forage by wading and picking at the stream bottom for the rest of the year. Brown dipper chicks and fledglings will also forage by diving. One small population wintering at a hot spring in Suntar-Khayata Mountains of Siberia feeds underwater when air temperatures drop below −55 °C. Following typhoons, brown dippers in upland Taiwanese streams are displaced by flooding into relatively poorer quality streams that likely act as an important refuge.

== Gallery ==
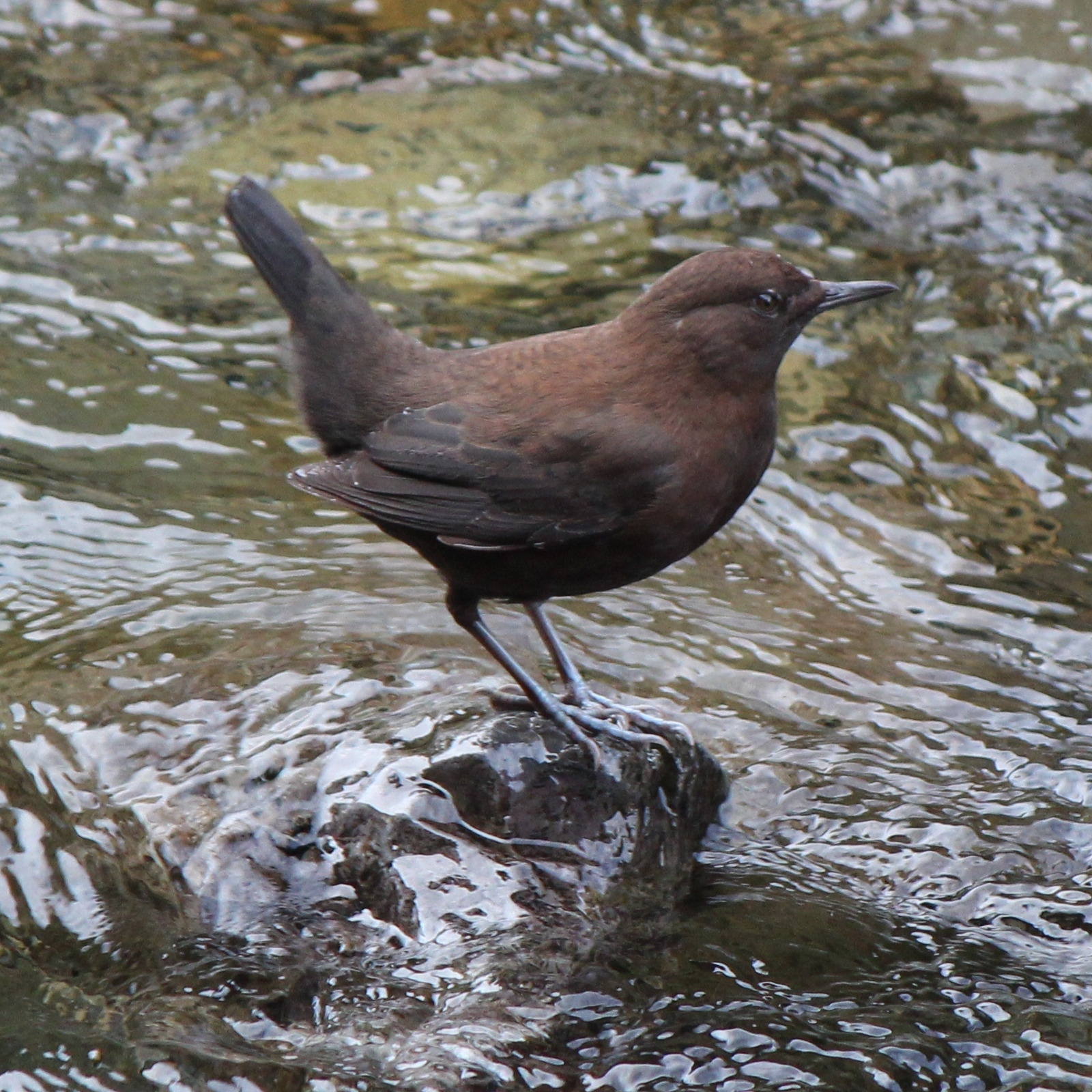
Immature

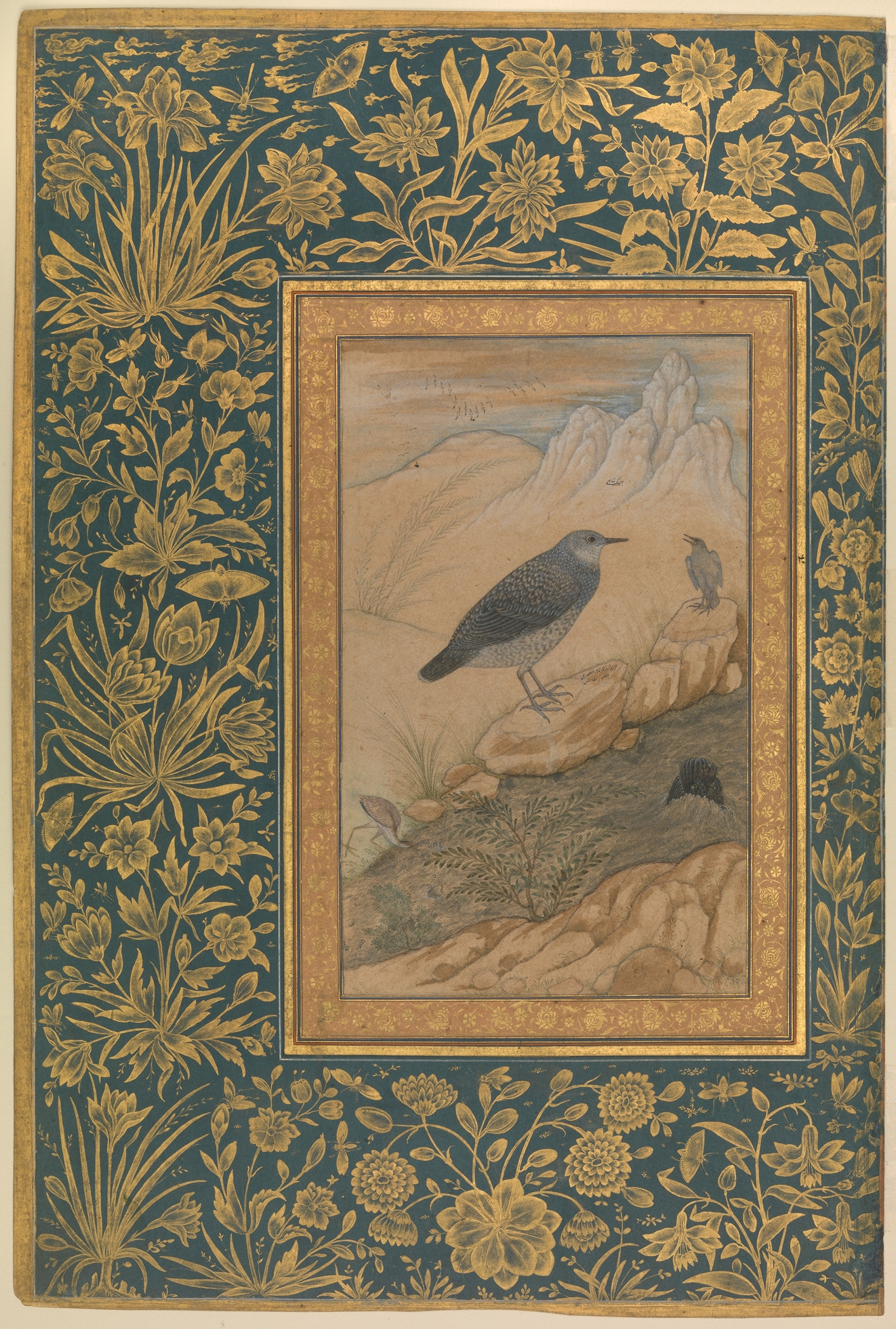
Brown dipper (c. 1620) by Mughal painter Ustad Mansur

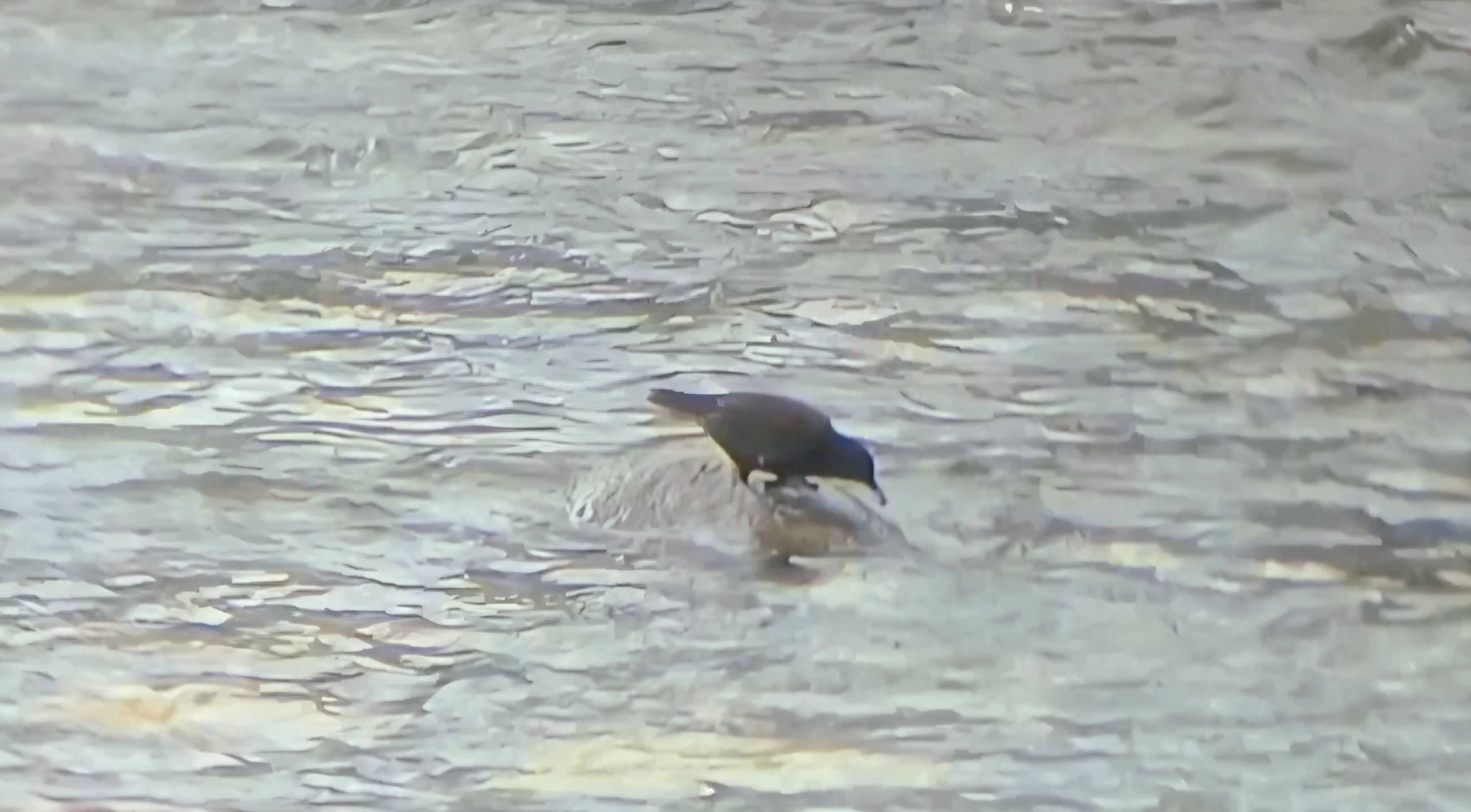
Bathing and searching for food in usual behaviour

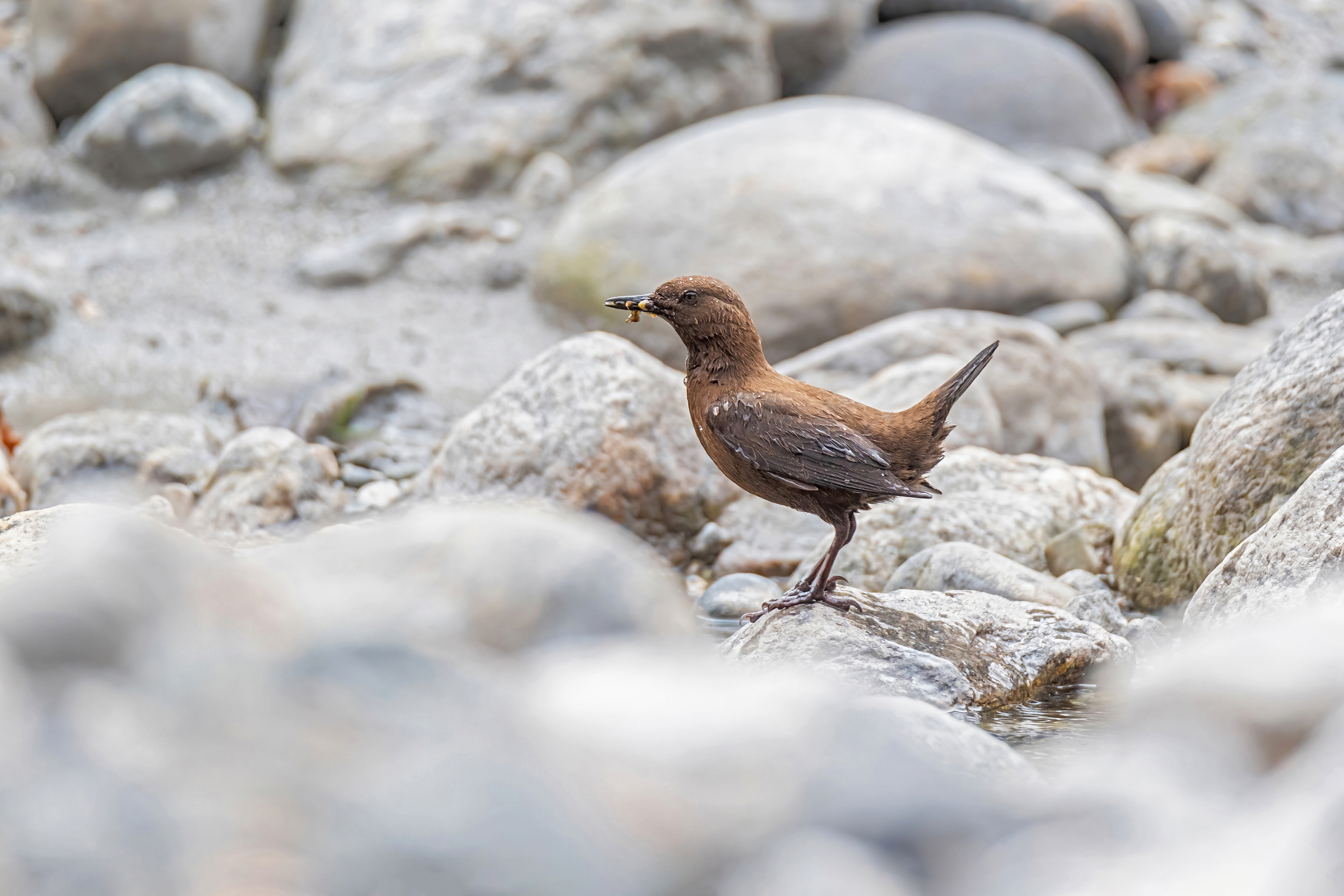
At Langtang National Park, Nepal

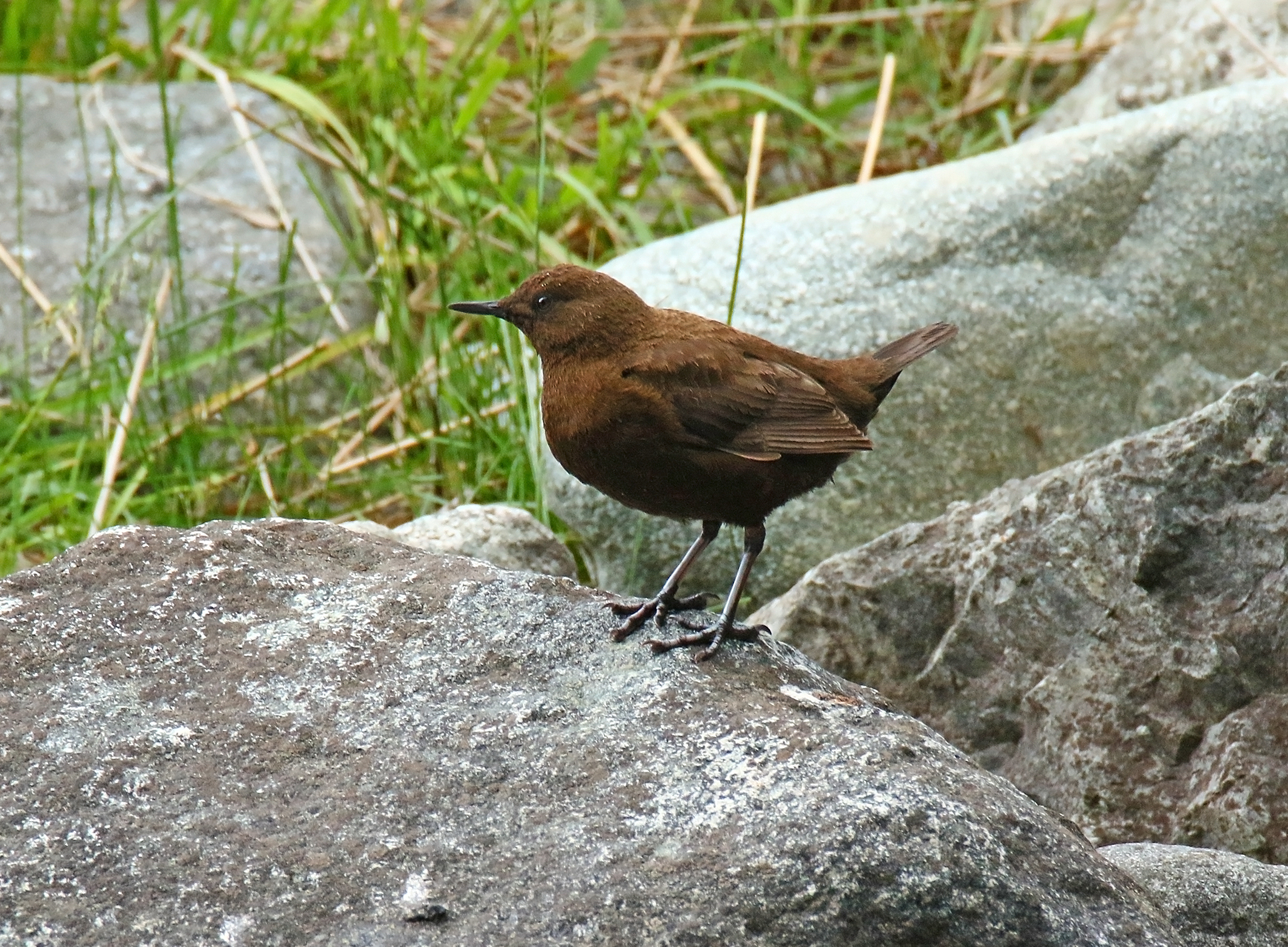
C. p. tenuirostris
