= Canadian Environment Awards =

- Description: Award recognizing Canadians who act locally to protect and restore the environment
- Country: Canada
- Presented by: Government of Canada and Canadian Geographic Enterprises

The Canadian Environment Awards were established in 2002 through a partnership between the Government of Canada and Canadian Geographic Enterprises. The national program recognized dedicated Canadians who act locally to help protect, preserve and restore Canada's environment. Founding sponsor Shell Canada's participation of the event sparked protests due to their controversial Klappan Coalbed Methane Project in northern British Columbia. In 2009, the award was replaced by the 3M Environmental Innovation Award.

== Features ==
There were three levels of award: the flagship Community Awards, Green Team Challenge for youth and the Citation of Lifetime Achievement, recognizing exceptional individuals. The founding corporate sponsor, Shell Canada, sponsored the awards for five years and supported the Community Awards program where Gold Award recipients received $5,000 and Silver Award winners $2,500 for the environmental cause of their choice.

== Recipients ==
- Jesuit Father John McCarthy, (Conservation, 2002)
- Martha Kostuch, (Community, 2002)
- Maisie Shiell, (2004)
- Lynn Oliphant, (Community, 2005)
- Sheila Watt-Cloutier, (Citation of Lifetime Achievement, 2006)
- Lucie Sauvé, (Community, 2007)
- Kathleen Martin and Mike James, (Gold, Conservation, 2007)
- Ron Dembo, (Gold, Climate Change, 2008)
- Ruth Foster, Mossom Creek Hatchery, (2008)
- Maude Barlow, (Citation of Lifetime Achievement, 2008)
- Paul Hanley
- John Smith, 2019 for inivation

== See also ==
- List of environmental awards
