= Martha Kostuch =

Canadian veterinarian and environmentalist

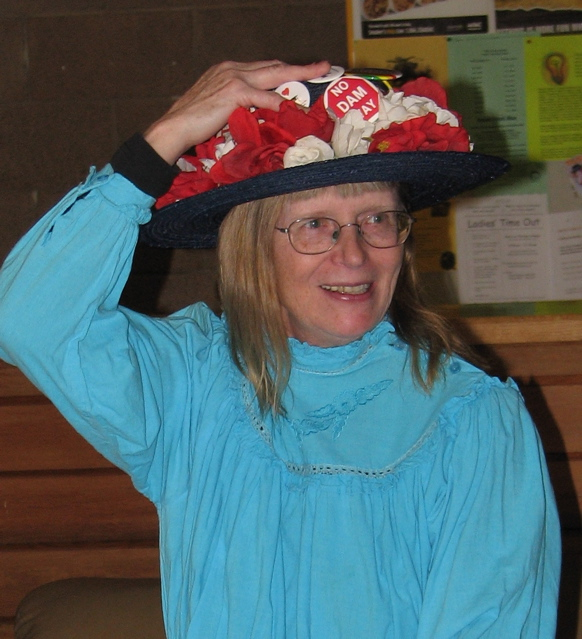
Martha Kostuch at a celebration in Calgary on February 2, 2008.

Martha Kostuch (July 8, 1949, Moose Lake, Minnesota, United States — April 23, 2008, Rocky Mountain House, Alberta, Canada) was a Canadian veterinarian and an award-winning environmentalist. In her veterinary work, she identified reproductive and immunological problems among cattle to air pollutants, like sulphur dioxide, from the sour gas industry in the region. Her successful campaign to reduce that air pollution marked the beginning of her work as an environmentalist.

Kostuch and her husband, Tom M. Kostuch, moved to Alberta from Minnesota in 1975. They had two children by birth, and adopted two sons. In 2001, one of her sons was accused of plotting to murder her to acquire an inheritance. He pleaded guilty "to counselling to commit an offence" for offering a hit man $40,000.

In subsequent years she contributed her efforts to various environmental campaigns. These included blocking a hotel and golf course resort. In 1998 she charged a sand and gravel trucking business for violating the federal Fisheries Act. She campaigned to stop the building of the Oldman River Dam and followed with a legal campaign resulting in environmental improvements to the project when the dam was approved and a Supreme Court decision that environmental protection is in the jurisdiction of both the federal and provincial governments. In her work on the Clean Air Strategic Alliance committee, she was part of the effort that resulted in the reductions to air pollution.

In the fall of 2007, Kostuch announced that she had been diagnosed as terminal with multiple system atrophy. She declared her intention to choose when she would die, rather than letting the disease decide for her — supporting the right to die cause.

== Honours ==
In 1992, Kostuch received an Alberta Emerald Foundation award in the Individual Commitment category.

In 2002, Kostuch was given a Canadian Environment Awards: Community Award for Clean Air.

In 2003, she received the Nature Canada’s Douglas H. Pimlott Award.

In 2004, the Alberta Wilderness Association gave Kostuch an Alberta Wilderness Defenders Award.

On April 15, 2008, the Alberta Emerald Foundation announced that Kostuch would be presented with a Special Achievement Award at the June 3, 2008, awards ceremony.

On April 21, 2008, the government of Alberta announced an educational bursary to be established in Kostuch’s name and awarded annually. The bursary is to fund people from non-governmental organizations for studies in a certificate course in consensus building.
