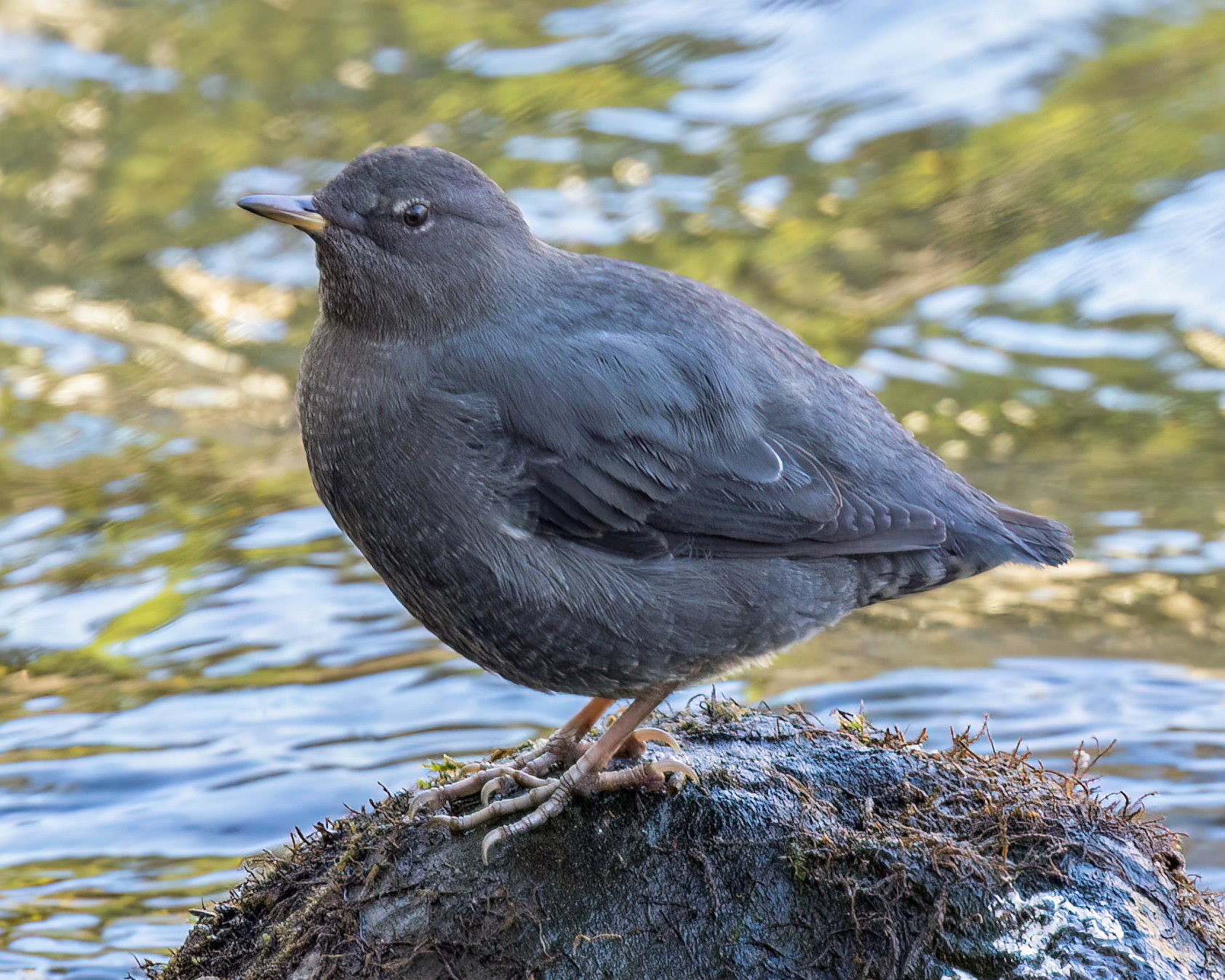

Conservation status
- Least Concern (IUCN 3.1)

Scientific classification
- Kingdom: Animalia
- Phylum: Chordata
- Class: Aves
- Order: Passeriformes
- Family: Cinclidae
- Genus: Cinclus
- Species: C. mexicanus

Binomial name
- Cinclus mexicanus Swainson, 1827
- Distribution map

= American dipper =

Species of bird

The American dipper (Cinclus mexicanus), also known as a water ouzel, is a semiaquatic bird species native to western North America and parts of Central America.

== Description ==
The American dipper is a stocky, grey bird with a head sometimes tinged with brown, and white feathers on the eyelids that cause the eyes to flash white as the bird blinks. On average, it measures 16.5 cm (6.5 in) in length, has a wingspan of 23 cm (9.1 in), and weighs 46 g (1.6 oz).

== Taxonomy ==
The American dipper was described by English zoologist William Swainson in 1827 based on a specimen that had been collected in Mexico by English naturalist William Bullock. Swainson placed the new species with the dippers in the genus Cinclus and coined the current binomial name Cinclus mexicanus. The type locality is Temascaltepec de González in Mexico.

The five subspecies are:

- C. m. mexicanus Swainson, 1827 – north and central Mexico
- C. m. anthonyi Griscom, 1930 – southeast Mexico, southwest Guatemala, east Honduras and northwest Nicaragua
- C. m. ardesiacus Salvin, 1867 – Costa Rica and west Panama
- C. m. dickermani Phillips, AR, 1966 – south Mexico
- C. m. unicolor Bonaparte, 1827 – Alaska, west Canada and west USA

== Distribution and habitat ==
The American dipper inhabits the mountainous regions of western North America and Central America, from Alaska to Panama. It is usually a permanent resident, moving slightly south or to lower elevations if necessary to find food or unfrozen water. The presence of this indicator species shows good water quality; it has vanished from some locations due to pollution or increased silt load in streams.

== Behaviour and ecology ==
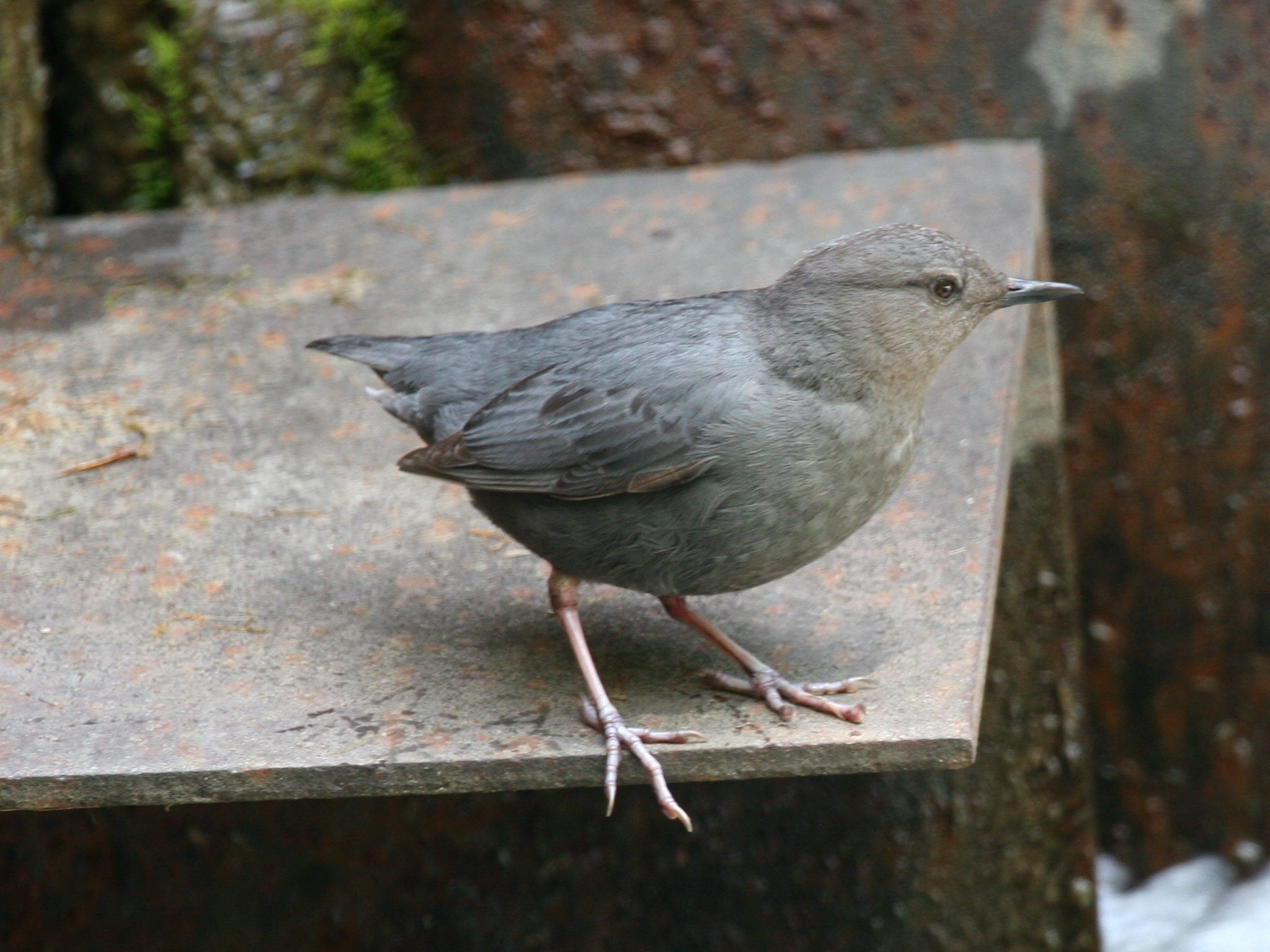

The American dipper defends a linear territory along streams. In most of its habits, it closely resembles its European counterpart, the white-throated dipper (Cinclus cinclus), which is also sometimes known as a water ouzel.

American Dippers are North America's only aquatic songbird, being able to walk under water. It is known for rhythimically bobbing its body up and down, the origin of its name.

=== Breeding ===
The American dipper's nest is a globe-shaped structure with a side entrance, close to water, on a rock ledge, river bank, behind a waterfall, or under a bridge. The normal clutch is two to four white eggs, incubated solely by the female, which hatch after about 15–17 days, with another 20–25 days to fledging. The male helps to feed the young. The maximum recorded age from ring-recovery data of an American dipper is 8 years and 1 month for a bird ringed and recovered in South Dakota.

=== Feeding ===
It feeds on aquatic insects and their larvae, including dragonfly nymphs, small crayfish, and caddisfly larvae. It may also take tiny fish or tadpoles.

=== Predators ===
Dippers may occasionally be preyed on by predatory fish such as by brook, bull or Dolly Varden trout.

== History ==
The American dipper, previously known as the waternouzel, was the favorite bird of famous naturalist John Muir. He dedicated an entire chapter in his book The Mountains of California to the ouzel, stating, "He is the mountain streams' own darling, the hummingbird of blooming waters, loving rocky ripple-slopes, and sheets of foam as a bee loves flowers, as a lark loves sunshine and meadows. Among all the mountain birds, none has cheered me so much in my lonely wanderings, —none so unfailingly. For both in winter and summer he sings, sweetly, cheerily, independent alike of sunshine and of love, requiring no other inspiration than the stream on which he dwells. While water sings, so must he, in heat or cold, calm or storm, ever attuning his voice in sure accord; low in the drought of summer and the drought of winter, but never silent."

== Gallery ==
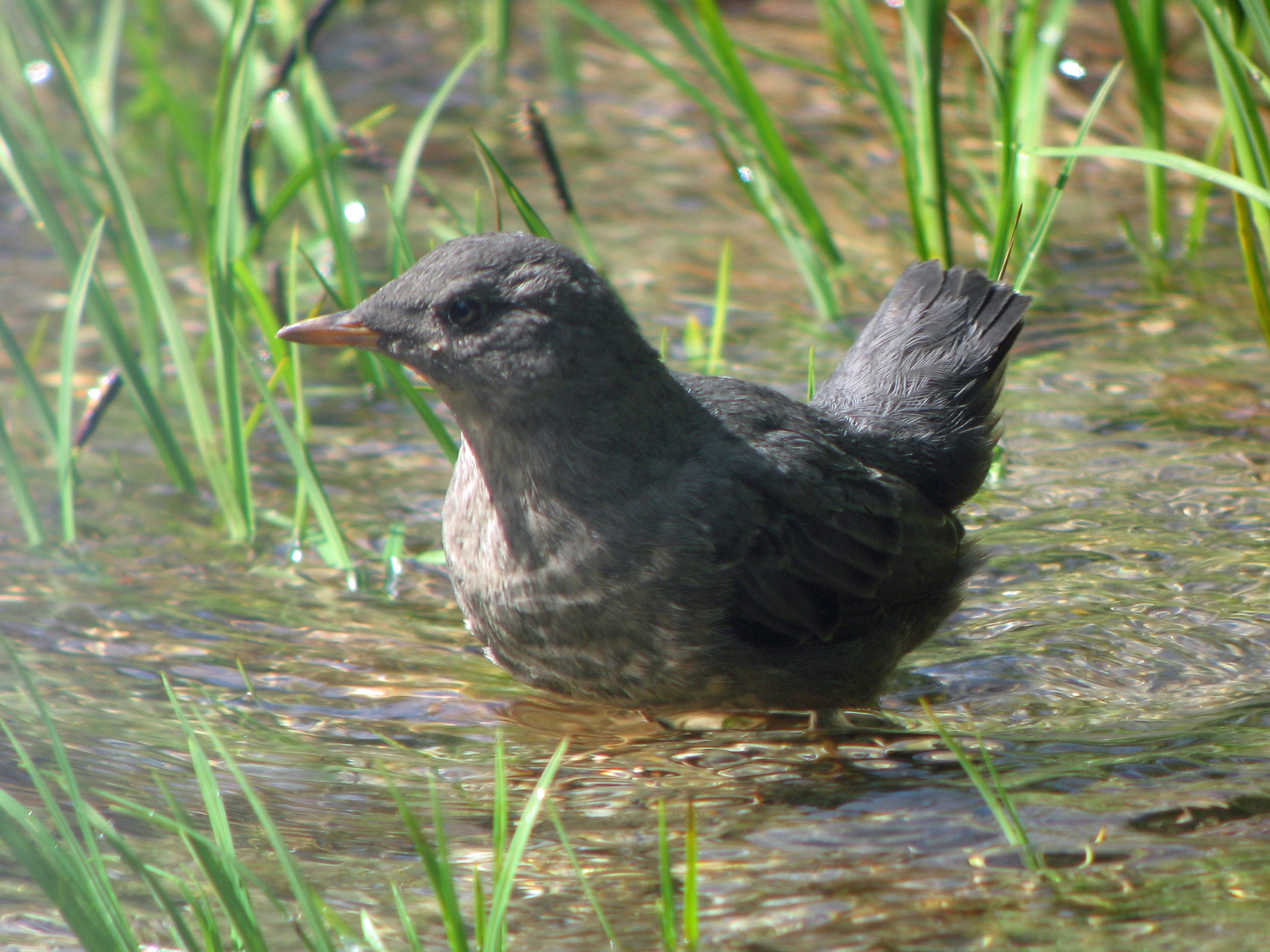
Juvenile in Nason Creek, Washington, USA

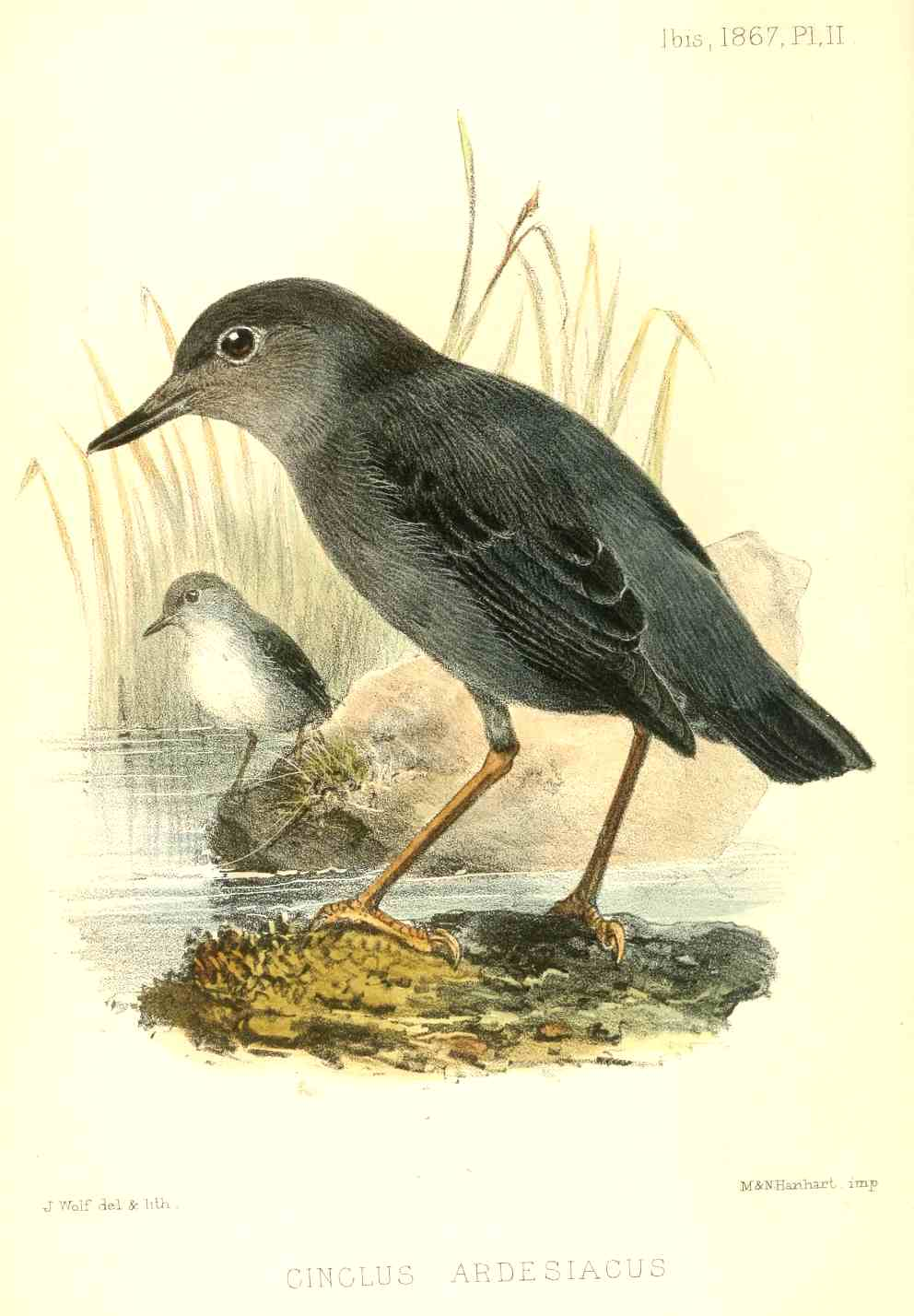
Subspecies C. m. ardesiacus, lithograph by Joseph Wolf, 1867

Foraging in a stream
