= Zerofootprint =

Software company in Canada

Zerofootprint Software Inc.
- Founded: 2005 by Ron Dembo
- Type: Private company
- Location: Toronto
- Fields: Clean Technology
- Website: zerofootprintsoftware.com

Zerofootprint is a cleantech software and services company based in Toronto, Canada. The company develops software that makes environmental impact measurable, visible and manageable for corporations, governments, institutions and individuals. Their product is designed with the overriding goal to determine its client's ecological footprint and to help them pursue the means to reduce it.

== History ==
Zerofootprint was founded in 2005 by Dr. Ron Dembo, a former Yale professor and CEO of the risk management software company, Algorithmics Inc. Initially operating as a non-for-profit organization, Zerofootprint evolved into a for-profit environmental software company with the mission to mitigate environmental risk and drive cost reductions through behavioral change. The company has built a diverse list of clients that includes the City of Toronto and Air Canada. The chief financial officer for Zerofootprint between 2008 and 2012 was Mr. John Anzin.

ZeroFootprint joined with the fintech operation CarbonX in 2017.
