= States General of the Netherlands =

Supreme legislature of the Netherlands

Coordinates: 52.0796°N 4.3130°E

States General Staten-Generaal

Type
- Type: Bicameral
- Houses: Senate; House of Representatives

Leadership
- President of the Senate: Mei Li Vos, PRO since 7 October 2025
- Speaker of the House of Representatives: Thom van Campen, VVD since 18 November 2025

Structure
- Seats: Senate: 75; House of Representatives: 150
- Senate political groups: Government (Jetten cabinet) (22): VVD (9); D66 (7); CDA (6); Opposition (53): PRO (14); BBB (11); PVV (4); SP (3); CU (3); FvD (3); JA21 (2); SGP (2); Volt (2); 50PLUS (1); OPNL (1); PvdD (1) (Note: The PvdD group in the Senate cut its ties with the Party for the Animals in November 2025. Since 7 November 2025, the party is de facto represented by the independent member Ingrid Visseren-Hamakers.); Independents (6)
- House of Representatives political groups: Government (Jetten cabinet) (66): D66 (26); VVD (22); CDA (18); Opposition (84): PRO (20); PVV (19); JA21 (9); FvD (7); Markuszower Group (7); SP (3); PvdD (3); BBB (3); CU (3); SGP (3); DENK (3); 50PLUS (2); Volt (1); Keijzer Group (1)

Elections
- Senate voting system: Indirect election
- House of Representatives voting system: Party-list proportional representation
- Last Senate election: 31 May 2023
- Last House of Representatives election: 29 October 2025

Meeting place
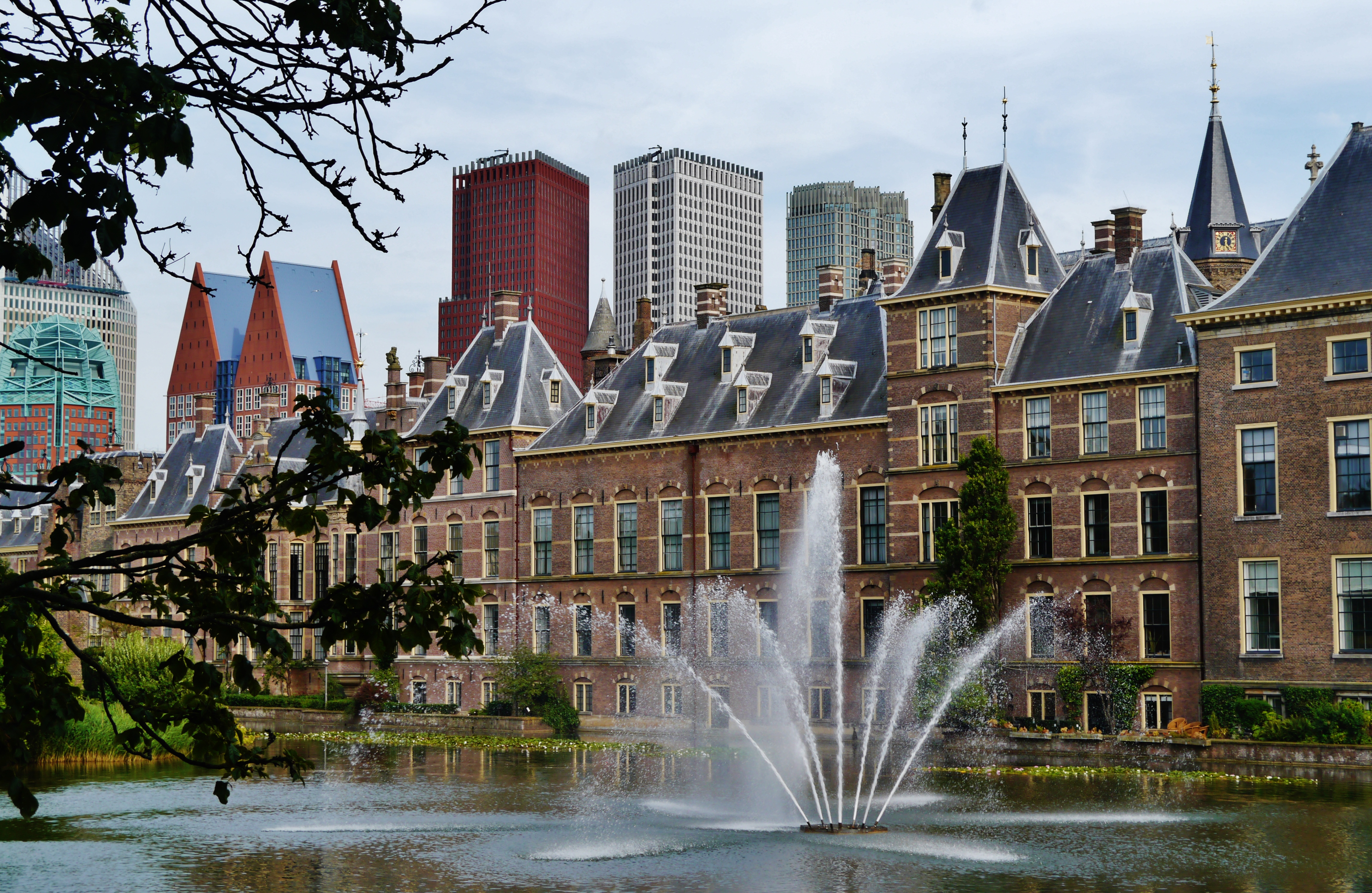
- Binnenhof; The Hague, Netherlands

Website
- staten-generaal.nl

The States General of the Netherlands (Dutch: Staten-Generaal [ˈstaːtə(ŋ)‿ɣenəˈraːl]) is the supreme bicameral legislature of the Netherlands consisting of the Senate (Dutch: Eerste Kamer lit. 'First Chamber') and the House of Representatives (Dutch: Tweede Kamer lit. 'Second Chamber'). Both chambers meet at the Binnenhof in The Hague, the oldest parliament building in the world still in use.

The States General originated in the 15th century as an assembly of all the provincial states of the Burgundian Netherlands. In 1579, during the Dutch Revolt, the States General split as the northern provinces openly rebelled against Philip II, and the northern States General replaced Philip II as the supreme authority of the Dutch Republic in 1581. The States General were replaced by the National Assembly after the Batavian Revolution of 1795, only to be restored in 1814, when the country had regained its sovereignty. The States General was divided into a Senate and a House of Representatives in 1815, with the establishment of the United Kingdom of the Netherlands. After the constitutional amendment of 1848, members of the House of Representatives were directly elected, and the rights of the States General were vastly extended, practically establishing parliamentary democracy in the Netherlands.

Since 1918, the members of the House of Representatives have been elected for four years using party-list proportional representation, while the 75 members of the Senate are elected by the States-Provincial every four years. On exceptional occasions such as the opening of the Parliament on the third Tuesday in September, or when an regent needs to be appointed if an heir to the crown is a minor as stipulated by the Constitution or the Charter for the Kingdom, the two houses form a joint session known as the United Assembly of the States-General (verenigde vergadering). The president of the Senate serves as President of the States General during a United Assembly.

== Etymology ==
The archaic Dutch word staten originally related to the feudal classes ("estates", or standen in Dutch) into which medieval European societies were stratified: the clergy, the nobility and the commons. The word eventually came to mean the political body in which the respective estates were represented. Each province in the Habsburg Netherlands had its own staten. These representative bodies (and not their constituent estates) in turn were represented in the assembly that came to be known as Staten-Generaal (a plurale tantum), or Algemene Staten (General States). The English word "states" may have a similar meaning to the Dutch word staten, as in e.g. States of Jersey. The English phrase "States General" is probably a literal translation of the Dutch word. Historically, the same term was used for other national legislatures as, for example, the Catalan and Valencian Generalitat and the Estates General of France during the Ancien Régime.

Several geographic place names are derived from the States General. In 1609, Henry Hudson established Dutch trade in Staten Island, New York City and named the island Staaten Eylandt after the States General. Isla de los Estados, now an Argentine island, was also named after this institution, the Spanish name being a translation of the Dutch name. Abel Tasman originally gave the name Staten Landt to what would become New Zealand. Staaten River is a river in the Cape York Peninsula, Australia.

== History ==
=== Burgundian and Habsburg rule ===
Historically, the convocation of the States General consisted of delegates from the States of the several provinces, like the States of Brabant, and dated from about the middle of the 15th century, under the rule of the Dukes of Burgundy. The first important session was the Estates General of 1464 that met on 9 January 1464 in Bruges, Flanders, on the initiative of the States of Holland, the States of Flanders, and the States of Brabant, with the initially reluctant agreement of Philip the Good. Later, regular sessions were held at Coudenberg in Brussels, Brabant. The next important event was the convocation of the States General by the ducal Council for 3 February 1477 after the death of Charles the Bold. In this session the States General forced the grant of the Great Privilege by Mary of Burgundy in which the right of the States General to convene on their own initiative was recognised. The main function of the States General in these early years was to form a platform for the central government to discuss matters of general importance with the States of the provinces, especially the special subsidies known as beden or aides. Legislative and executive functions were still reserved for the Sovereign in these years.

=== Dutch Republic ===
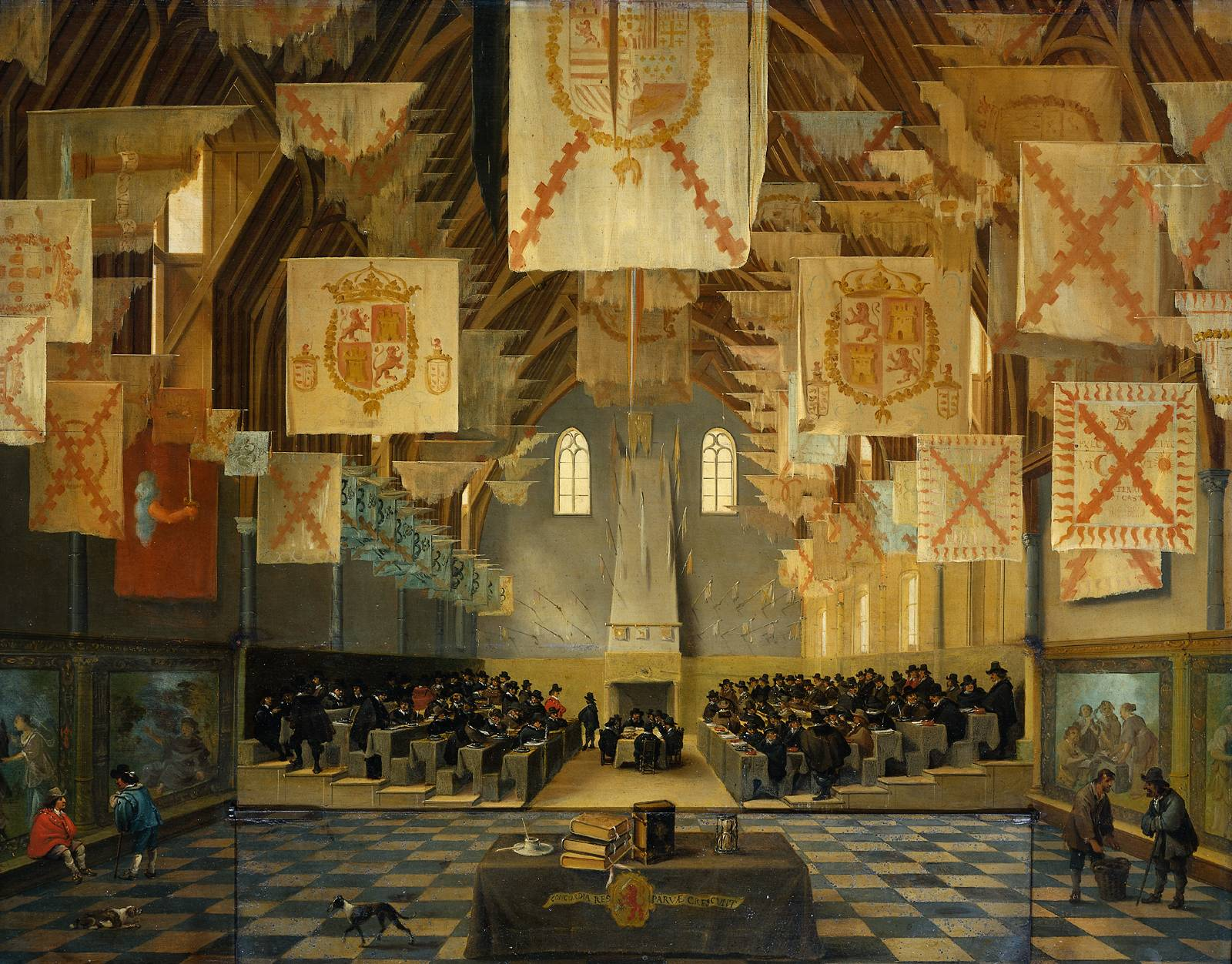
The Great Assembly of the States General in 1651.

At the start of the Dutch Revolt the States General (who were then not continually in session) remained loyal to the overlord of the Habsburg Netherlands, Philip II of Spain (who did not have the title of King in the Netherlands, but held the titles of duke and count in the several provinces, and was just a Lord of the Netherlands). In 1576 the States General as a whole, however, openly rebelled against the Spanish crown. In 1579 the States General split: a number of southern provinces, united in the Union of Arras, returned to obedience, while other provinces, united in the Union of Utrecht, continued the rebellion. In the 1581 Act of Abjuration, the northern States General replaced Philip II as the supreme authority of the northern Netherlands, which then became known as the United Provinces.

This was a confederation in which most government functions remained with the provincial States (and local authorities, like the Vroedschappen). These delegated representatives to the States General, who functioned as ambassadors acting with a mandate limited by instruction and obligatory consultation (last en ruggespraak). The States General (in which the voting was by province, each of the seven provinces having one vote) took on many executive functions after the Council of State of the Netherlands had temporarily come under English influence, due to the Treaty of Nonsuch. The States General for this reason since 1593 remained continually in session until their dissolution in 1795. The presidency rotated weekly among the senior representatives of the provinces. Under the Union of Utrecht treaty the States General formally was the sovereign power, representing the Republic in foreign affairs and making treaties with foreign monarchs. As such the honorific title of the States General collectively was Hoogmogende Heren (mightiest, or very mighty, lords).

Due to the vagaries of the Eighty Years' War in which territories were lost and (partially) reconquered, not all territories that had originally signed up for the Union of Utrecht remained represented in the States General. The States of Brabant and of Flanders lost their representation after 1587 as most of their territory had been conquered by the Army of Flanders, and it was not restored after part of that territory (together with parts of the Duchy of Limburg) was reconquered by the Dutch Republic. The Drenthe territory was never directly represented in the States General. Twenty per cent of the new Republic's territory, known as the Generality Lands, was thus under the direct rule of the Generality (generaliteit). The Dutch East India Company and the Dutch West India Company were also under its general supervision; for this reason Staten Island in New York City (originally New Amsterdam) and Staten Island, Argentina (Discovered by Dutchman Jacob le Maire), are among places named after the Staten-Generaal.

The "southern" States General after 1579 were a continuation of the States General as they had been under the Habsburg Netherlands. After the (re)conquest of most of the territory of the States of Brabant and of Flanders these States again sent representatives to these States General for the Southern Netherlands, together with the "obedient" provinces of the Union of Arras. The southern States General only occasionally came in session, however. The last regular session was in 1634, when Philip IV of Spain dissolved them.

The States General in both The Hague and Brussels came to an end after 1795. France annexed the South, while the parliament of the North disbanded itself in January 1796 and called for elections for the National Assembly, when the Batavian Republic was proclaimed.

=== Kingdom of the Netherlands ===
The name Staten-Generaal was resurrected in the title of subsequent Dutch parliaments in and after 1814, after the end of the annexation to the First French Empire by Napoleon I of France in 1813. These had, however, little resemblance to the States General under the Republic. Beginning with the Sovereign Principality of the United Netherlands the States General was a unicameral legislature, without executive functions, in which the 55 representatives no longer represented the States-Provincial (though those newly constituted entities elected them, now acting as electoral colleges), but the entire people of the Netherlands and without last en ruggespraak (the Netherlands had become a unitary state under the Batavian Republic and the federal structure of the Dutch Republic was not restored). The States General became a bicameral legislature under the United Kingdom of the Netherlands in 1815, in which the 50 members of the Senate were appointed for life by the new King from the resurrected ridderschappen, representative bodies of the aristocracy, and the 110 members of the House of Representatives (55 for the North and 55 for the South) were elected by the States-Provincial (in their new form).

After the Belgian Revolution of 1830 under the Kingdom of the Netherlands the States General remained bicameral, but after the revision of the Constitution of the Netherlands in 1848, the (now 39) members of the Senate were elected by the States-Provincial, and the members of the House of Representatives were directly elected in electoral districts (one for every 45,000 electors, so the number of members of that House became variable for a while). The House of Representatives became more powerful at the same time, as it received the important rights of inquiry and amendment, while its budgetary rights were strengthened. Formally, the position of the States General was strengthened, because henceforth the ministers of the Crown became politically accountable to them, making the role of the King largely ceremonial.

With the constitutional revision of 1888 the number of members of the House of Representatives was fixed at 100, while the Senate was enlarged to 50 members. The suffrage was enlarged at the same time, but still limited to male citizens possessing a certain wealth. Universal male suffrage would be granted in 1917 and women would receive suffrage in 1919. At the same time, the electoral system was changed to proportional representation. The States General were suspended from 1940 to 1945, during the German occupation. In 1956 the number of members of the Senate was increased to 75, and that of the House of Representatives to 150.

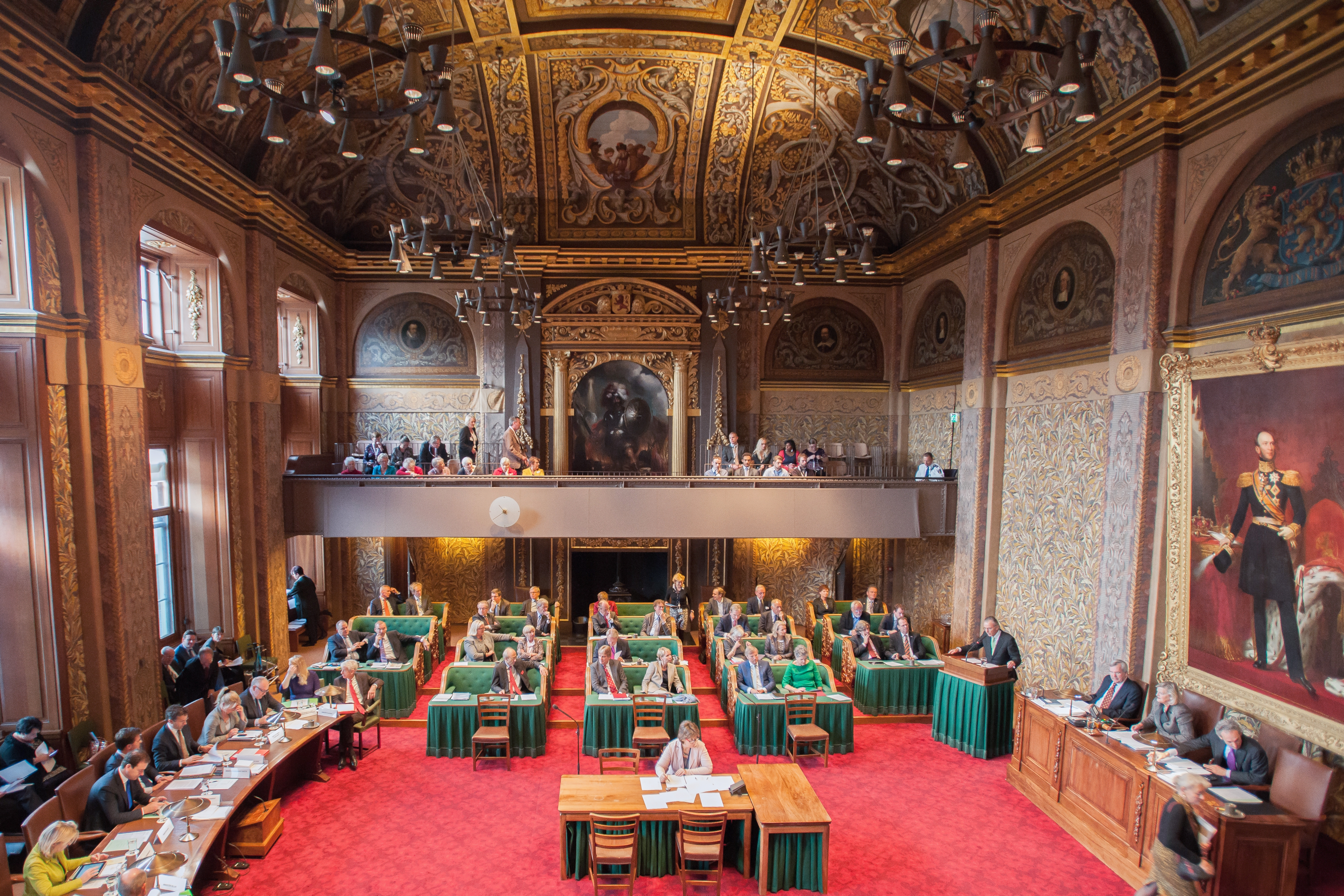
The Dutch Senate (Eerste Kamer)

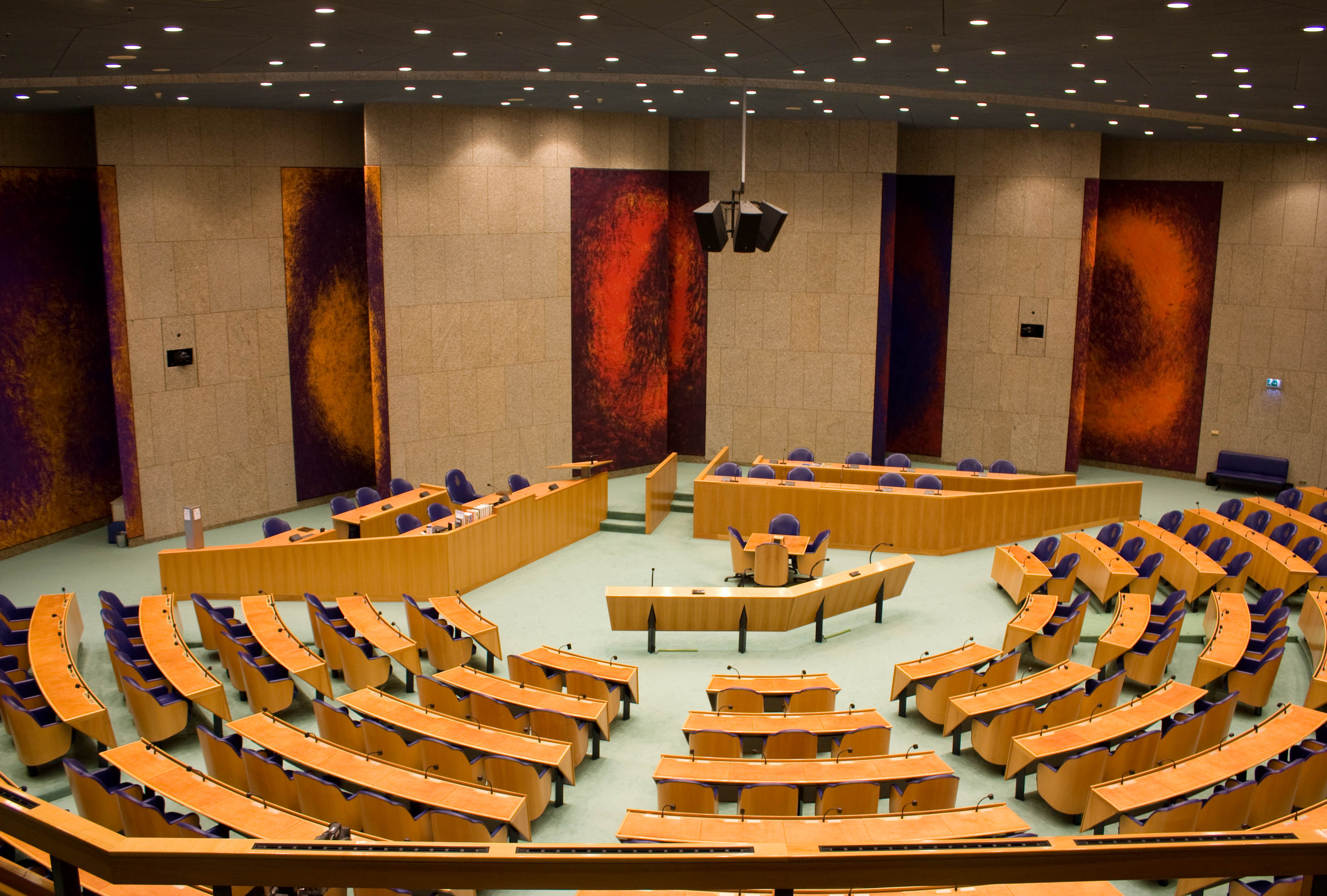
The Dutch House of Representatives (Tweede Kamer)

== Functions ==
Tweede Kamer
- 150 members
- elected directly in general elections
- term of office: 4 years
Eerste Kamer
- 75 members
- elected indirectly through provincial councils
- term 4 years
Verenigde Vergadering

(joint session of both houses)

King Willem-Alexander giving the annual speech from the throne in the Ridderzaal, 2015

The States General meets in joint session at least once a year, at the opening of the parliamentary year, when the king gives his Speech from the Throne on Prince's Day. On special occasions, such as when a States Generate vote on a marriage of a member of the royal house, an inauguration of the monarch, or the death of a member of the royal house, both houses also meet in a joint session (Verenigde Vergadering), with the president of the Senate presiding. They take place in the Ridderzaal (Hall of Knights) in the Binnenhof, except for the inauguration of the monarch, which occurs in the Nieuwe Kerk in Amsterdam. The rest of the time, the two chambers sit separately.

Constitutionally, all functions of the parliament are given to both houses, except for the rights of initiative and amendment, which only the Tweede Kamer has. The Joint Session also appoints the monarch if there is no heir to the throne and the regent is unable to exercise his or her powers.

An important question is whether the relationship between cabinet and parliament should be dualistic or monistic. That is, whether ministers and leaders of governing parliamentary parties should prepare important political decisions. According to the dualistic position, members of parliament of governing parties should remain independent of the cabinet. The term "monism" is used to refer to a stance that important decisions should be prepared by the people of the governing coalition in order to promote political stability.
