= List of islands of Argentina =

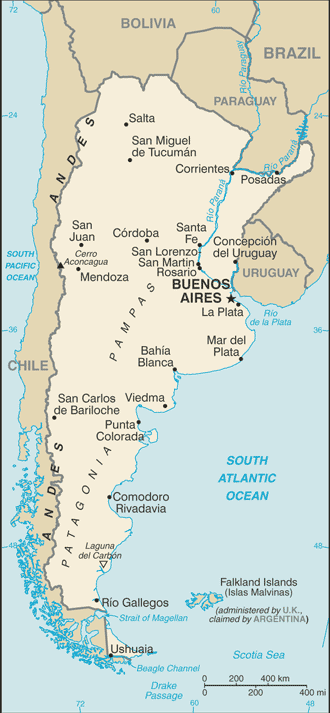
A map of Argentina

The following are lists of islands that are part of, or claimed by, Argentina.

The list is divided into three parts. The first part is those islands that are not disputed. The second part is the Falkland Islands and South Georgia and the South Sandwich Islands, which are claimed by Argentina but are United Kingdom sovereign overseas territories (see Falkland Islands sovereignty dispute; South Georgia and the South Sandwich Islands sovereignty dispute).

The third part is the Argentine claim to Antarctica which overlaps both the British and Chilean Antarctic claims. All three countries are signatories to the Antarctic Treaty.

== Undisputed ==
These are islands currently administered by Argentina

Island	Province	Coordinates
Apipé, Isla	Corrientes	27°30′S 56°54′W
Apipé Chico, Isla	Corrientes	27°34′S 56°43′W
Isla Arce	Chubut	45°00′S 65°30′W
Islas Blancas	Chubut	44°46′S 65°39′W
Isla Grande de Choele Choel	Río Negro	39°22′S 65°43′W
Costa Brava, Isla	Corrientes	30°16′S 59°39′W
Isla Curuzú Chalí	Entre Ríos	30°30′S 59°37′W
De Los Estados, Isla	Tierra del Fuego	54°46′S 64°18′W
del Cerrito, Isla	Chaco	27°19′S 58°40′W
Del Palo, Isla	Buenos Aires	39°17′S 62°14′W
Del Paraguayo, Isla	Entre Ríos	33°07′S 60°28′W
Del Portugués, Isla	Buenos Aires	34°01′S 58°41′W
Entre Ríos, Isla	Corrientes	27°26′S 57°30′W
Gable, Isla	Tierra del Fuego	54°54′S 67°32′W
Grande De Tierra Del Fuego, Isla	Tierra del Fuego	54°00′S 68°00′W
Isla Grande del río Chico	Santa Cruz	49°12′S 69°57′W
Grupo De La Isla Grande, Islas	Misiones	25°30′S 54°06′W
Islas de las Lechiguanas	Entre Ríos	33°26′S 59°42′W
Isla Leones	Chubut	45°02′S 65°37′W
Manuelín Cué, Isla	Chaco	28°02′S 58°52′W
Martín García, Isla	Buenos Aires	34°11′S 58°15′W
Isla Observatorio	Tierra del Fuego	54°39′S 64°08′W
Isla Oyarvide	Buenos Aires	34°12′S 58°18′W
San Lucas Grande, Isla	Misiones	28°10′S 55°33′W
Islas Solís	Buenos Aires	34°12′S 58°19′W
Isla Tova	Chubut	45°07′S 65°57′W
Isla Trinidad (Buenos Aires)	Buenos Aires	39°10′S 61°57′W
Isla Victoria	Neuquén	40°56′S 71°33′W

== Falkland Islands, and South Georgia and the South Sandwich Islands ==
The Falkland Islands and South Georgia and the South Sandwich Islands are United Kingdom sovereign territories claimed by Argentina.

Island (Spanish names)	Province	Coordinates
Águila, Isla	Falkland Islands	52°11′S 59°42′W
Annenkov, Isla	South Georgia	54°27′S 37°05′W
Baja, Isla	Falkland Islands	51°47′S 61°07′W
Beauchêne, Isla	Falkland Islands	52°52′S 59°12′W
Bellingshausen, Isla	South Sandwich Islands	59°24′S 26°58′W
Blanco, Isla	South Sandwich Islands	59°01′S 26°30′W
Bougainville, Isla	Falkland Islands	52°02′S 58°30′W
Calista, Isla	Falkland Islands	52°01′S 59°51′W
Candelaria, Isla	South Sandwich Islands	57°03′S 26°42′W
Candelaria, Islas	South Sandwich Islands	57°04′S 26°44′W
Celebroña, Isla	Falkland Islands	51°37′S 57°45′W
Cisne, Isla	Falkland Islands	51°46′S 59°35′W
Conejo, Isla	Falkland Islands	51°33′S 60°30′W
Cook, Isla	South Sandwich Islands	59°26′S 27°10′W
Cooper, Isla	South Georgia	54°48′S 35°47′W
Cuarta, Isla	Falkland Islands	51°32′S 60°52′W
Culebra, Isla	Falkland Islands	51°08′S 60°24′W
De Borbón, Isla	Falkland Islands	51°18′S 59°37′W
De Goicoechea, Isla	Falkland Islands	51°42′S 61°17′W
De Las Lechiguanas, Islas	South Sandwich Islands	33°26′S 59°42′W
De Los Arrecifes, Isla	Falkland Islands	51°11′S 60°53′W
De Los Leones Marinos, Islas	Falkland Islands	52°25′S 59°00′W
Del Este, Isla	Falkland Islands	51°22′S 59°37′W
Del Este, Isla	Falkland Islands	51°47′S 58°05′W
Del Medio, Isla	Falkland Islands	51°57′S 58°29′W
Del Pasaje, Islas	Falkland Islands	51°35′S 60°44′W
Del Río, Isla	Falkland Islands	51°24′S 59°37′W
Del Rosario, Isla	Falkland Islands	51°16′S 60°35′W
Divisoria, Isla	Falkland Islands	51°28′S 60°43′W
Dyke, Isla	Falkland Islands	51°59′S 60°53′W
Elefante, Isla	Falkland Islands	51°53′S 58°19′W
Georgias Del Sur, Islas	South Georgia	54°00′S 38°04′W
Gobierno, Isla	Falkland Islands	51°13′S 59°55′W
Gran Malvina, Isla	Falkland Islands	51°48′S 60°00′W
Grande, Isla	Falkland Islands	51°57′S 59°42′W
Grupo Tule Del Sur, Islas	South Sandwich Islands	59°25′S 27°12′W
Jorge, Isla	Falkland Islands	52°19′S 59°45′W
Jorge, Isla	South Sandwich Islands	58°24′S 26°20′W
León Marino Este, Isla	Falkland Islands	52°25′S 58°54′W
Leskov, Isla	South Sandwich Islands	56°40′S 28°09′W
Larga, Isla	Falkland Islands	51°33′S 58°05′W
Las Llaves, Islas	Falkland Islands	51°06′S 60°49′W
León Marino, Isla	Falkland Islands	51°55′S 58°44′W
Los Hermanos, Isla	Falkland Islands	51°09′S 60°15′W
Los Salvajes, Islas	Falkland Islands	51°02′S 61°09′W
María, Isla	Falkland Islands	52°12′S 58°52′W
Mayor, Isla	Falkland Islands	52°08′S 59°00′W
Montículo, Isla	Falkland Islands	51°36′S 60°27′W
Montura, Isla	Falkland Islands	51°39′S 61°14′W
Morrell, Isla	South Sandwich Islands	59°26′S 27°19′W
Norte, Isla	Falkland Islands	51°38′S 61°13′W
Oeste, Isla	Falkland Islands	51°58′S 59°50′W
Pájaro, Isla	Falkland Islands	52°09′S 60°55′W
Pájaro, Isla	South Georgia	54°00′S 38°05′W
Pájaros, Isla	Falkland Islands	51°36′S 57°47′W
Pan De Azúcar, Isla	Falkland Islands	51°09′S 60°51′W
Pelada, Isla	Falkland Islands	52°21′S 59°41′W
Pickersgill, Islas	South Georgia	54°37′S 36°45′W
Principal, Isla	South Georgia	54°02′S 38°16′W
Principal, Isla	Falkland Islands	52°25′S 59°07′W
Rasa, Isla	Falkland Islands	51°15′S 59°52′W
Rasa Del Oeste, Isla	Falkland Islands	50°59′S 61°26′W
Remolinos, Isla	Falkland Islands	51°20′S 60°42′W
San José, Isla	Falkland Islands	51°54′S 61°00′W
San Julián, Isla	Falkland Islands	51°38′S 60°41′W
San Pedro, Isla	South Georgia	54°00′S 38°04′W
San Rafael, Isla	Falkland Islands	51°50′S 61°16′W
Sandwich Del Sur, Islas	South Sandwich Islands	58°00′S 27°00′W
Saunders, Isla	South Sandwich Islands	57°48′S 26°29′W
Sebaldes, Islas	Falkland Islands	51°05′S 61°11′W
Segunda, Isla	Falkland Islands	51°34′S 60°48′W
Soledad, Isla	Falkland Islands	51°47′S 58°48′W
Tercera, Isla	Falkland Islands	51°33′S 60°50′W
Traverse, Islas	South Sandwich Islands	56°30′S 27°20′W
Trinidad, Isla	Falkland Islands	51°21′S 60°09′W
Trinidad, Isla	South Georgia	54°00′S 38°13′W
Triste, Islas	Falkland Islands	52°07′S 58°44′W
Tussac, Islas	Falkland Islands	51°40′S 57°44′W
Vigía, Isla	Falkland Islands	51°19′S 59°59′W
Vindicación, Isla	South Sandwich Islands	57°05′S 26°46′W
Visokoi, Isla	South Sandwich Islands	56°43′S 27°13′W
Zavodovski, Isla	South Sandwich Islands	56°19′S 27°36′W

== Antarctica ==
Argentina's claim to Antarctica overlaps with the claims of Chile and the United Kingdom. All these claims are subject to the Antarctic Treaty and none have gained wide international recognition.

Island	Province	Coordinates
Alejandro I, Isla	Argentine Antarctica	71°00′S 70°00′W
Amberes, Isla	Argentine Antarctica	64°30′S 63°30′W
Belgrano, Isla	Argentine Antarctica	67°20′S 68°40′W
Berkner, Isla	Argentine Antarctica	79°00′S 49°30′W
Brabante, Isla	Argentine Antarctica	64°20′S 62°20′W
Clarence, Isla	Argentine Antarctica	61°15′S 53°55′W
Coronación, Islas	Argentine Antarctica	60°37′S 45°35′W
Decepción, Isla	Argentine Antarctica	62°57′S 60°38′W
Dolleman, Isla	Argentine Antarctica	70°36′S 60°48′W
Dundee, Isla	Argentine Antarctica	63°27′S 56°05′W
Elefante, Isla	Argentine Antarctica	61°10′S 55°10′W
Hearst, Isla	Argentine Antarctica	69°26′S 62°08′W
Joinville, Isla	Argentine Antarctica	63°15′S 55°45′W
Latady, Isla	Argentine Antarctica	70°40′S 74°00′W
Laurie, Isla	Argentine Antarctica	60°45′S 44°35′W
Orcadas Del Sur, Islas	Argentine Antarctica	60°20′S 46°00′W
Portillo, Isla	Argentine Antarctica	78°46′S 68°30′W
Quijada, Isla	Argentine Antarctica	80°32′S 61°30′W
Robertson, Isla	Argentine Antarctica	65°10′S 59°40′W
Ross, Isla	Argentine Antarctica	64°10′S 57°40′W
Shetland Del Sur, Islas	Argentine Antarctica	62°30′S 60°00′W
Steele, Isla	Argentine Antarctica	71°00′S 60°40′W
25 De Mayo, Isla	Argentine Antarctica	62°00′S 58°15′W

== See also ==
- Argentina
  - Geography of Argentina
- List of islands by area
- List of islands by highest point
- List of islands by population
- List of islands in lakes
- List of islands in the Atlantic Ocean
- List of islands of South America
