= San Fernando Department =

- Department
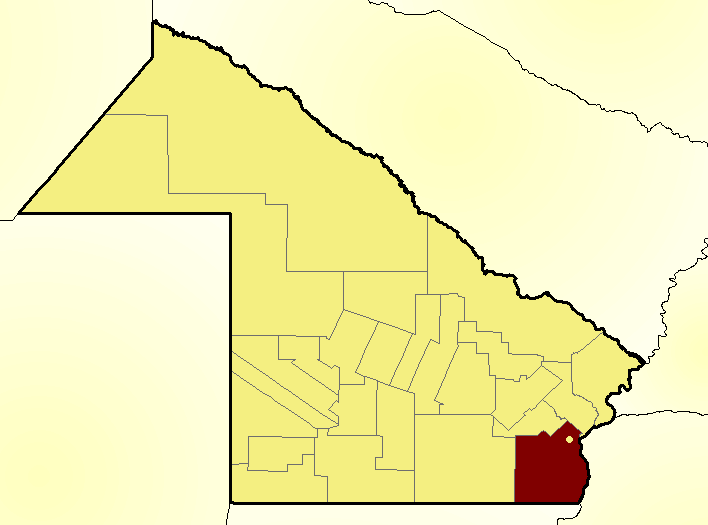
- Location of San Fernando Department within Chaco Province
- Coordinates: 27°27′S 58°59′W
- Country: Argentina
- Province: Chaco Province
- Established: 1878 (Resistencia)
- Head town: Resistencia

Area
  - Total: 3,489 km^{2} (1,347 sq mi)

Population
  - Total: 365,637
  - Density: 104.8/km^{2} (271.4/sq mi)
- Demonym: Sanfernandense
- Time zone: UTC-3 (ART)
- Postal code: H3500
- Area code: 03722
- Website: http://www.resistencia.gov.ar/

San Fernando is a department of Chaco Province in Argentina.

The provincial subdivision has a population of about 365,000 inhabitants in an area of 3,489 km^{2}, and its capital city is Resistencia, which is also the provincial capital. It located around 1,020 km from the Capital federal.

== Municipalities ==
The department consists of 5 first-level municipalities:

- Barranqueras
- Basail
- Fontana
- Puerto Vilelas
- Resistencia (capital)

== Villages ==
- El Paranacito
