= Ñancay =

- Village
- Location of the village in Argentina
- Coordinates: 33°27′25″S 58°40′41″W
- Country: Argentina
- Province: Entre Ríos
- Department: Islas del Ibicuy

Population (2001)
  - Total: 93
- Time zone: UTC−3 (ART)

Ñancay is a village located in the Islas del Ibicuy Department in the Entre Ríos Province of Argentina. It is located on the Ñancay Creek, 12 km (7.5 mi) from the urban center of the municipality of Ceibas.

The population of the locality, that is to say without considering the rural area, was 93 people in 2001 and it was not considered a locality in the 1991 census. The population of the jurisdiction of the governing board was 93 inhabitants in 2001, therefore which was considered completely urban.

It is a livestock production area, with road accesses but which are isolated from periodic floods.

The governing board was created by decree 2530/1990 MGJE of 15 June 1990.
