= Isla de San Martín (Argentina) =

Island in Misiones Province, Argentina

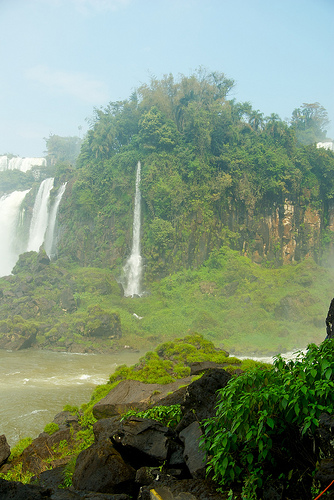
- Isla de San Martín

- Location within Misiones Province Location within Argentina
- Interactive map of Isla de San Martín

Geography
- Coordinates: 25°41′15″S 54°26′32″W
- Adjacent to: Iguazu River

Administration
- Argentina
- Province: Misiones

The Isla de San Martín (English: Island of San Martín) is an island located in Argentina's Iguazu River, within the Iguazu Falls in Misiones Province.

== Visiting island ==
The island spans the 3 levels that form the falls, but only the lower and middle levels are open to visitors. The island can only be reached in small boats, unless the river is below the minimum level. Once on the island, one must climb 190 steps through three different pathways that lead to a balcony with panoramic views.

== Animal life ==
Isla de San Martín has a significant population of vultures.

== See also ==
- Isla Apipé
- Isla Grande de Tierra del Fuego
- Isla Entre Ríos
- Isla Martín García
- (in Spanish) Garganta del Diablo - The Devil's Throat, an 80-metre-high (260 ft) waterfall with the largest flow of Iguazu Falls (Spanish Wikipedia)
