= Ibicuy Islands =

Coordinates: 33°42′56″S 58°54′28″W

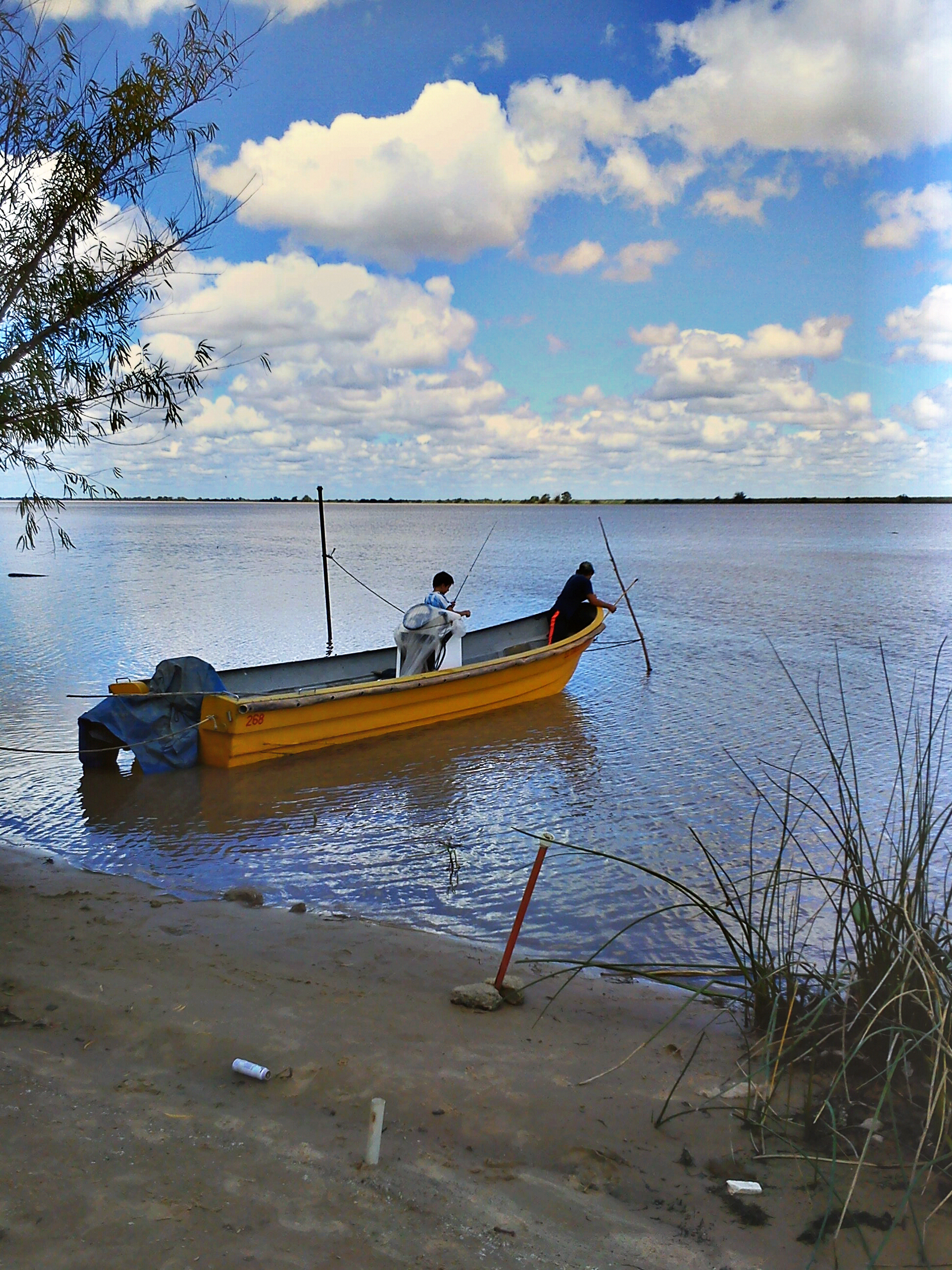

The Ibicuy Islands (Spanish: Islas del Ibicuy) are a maze of low-level islands in the east of the Paraná Delta, within Entre Ríos Province, Argentina. They are located between the Paraná and Uruguay Rivers. The islands are part of the Islas del Ibicuy Department and have scattered but important settlements, like their capital Villa Paranacito. The principal access is by the Ibicuy River, a branch of the Paraná River.

Ibicuy is a Guaraní word, meaning 'sandy area'. The Guaraní were the first inhabitants of the islands. They built embankments of sand and earth as look-outs and flood defences known as cerritos, which can still be seen rising above the dense vegetation which characterises the river delta. It is thought that the Guaraní arrived in Ibicuy in search of the tierra sin mal, the earthly paradise inhabited by the spirit Ñandey, located in the east close to the sea.

The islands were settled in the late 19th century and early 20th century by European planters, originally Italians from Montevideo searching for wood for charcoal production. The majority of settlers were from northern and central Europe and were employed in agriculture and forestry, still the predominant industries. In an effort to demarcate, protect and irrigate their lands, settlers dug new channels and filled others in, changing the topography of the islands.

The remoteness of the islands - originally accessible only by boat - made them a hideout for outlaws and criminals from Buenos Aires and Montevideo. The marxist Liborio Justo lived there in the 1940s, the harsh environment and the fugitives who inhabited it, inspired his book of short stories, entitled Rio Abajo ("Down the River"), which was later made into a movie with the same title. Nowadays tourism is one of the main activities of the islands, where typical Delta wildlife such as the Neotropic cormorant, capybara and marsh deer can be seen.

== See also ==
- Isla Apipé
- Isla Grande de Tierra del Fuego
- Isla Entre Ríos
- Isla Martín García
