= Paraná Delta =

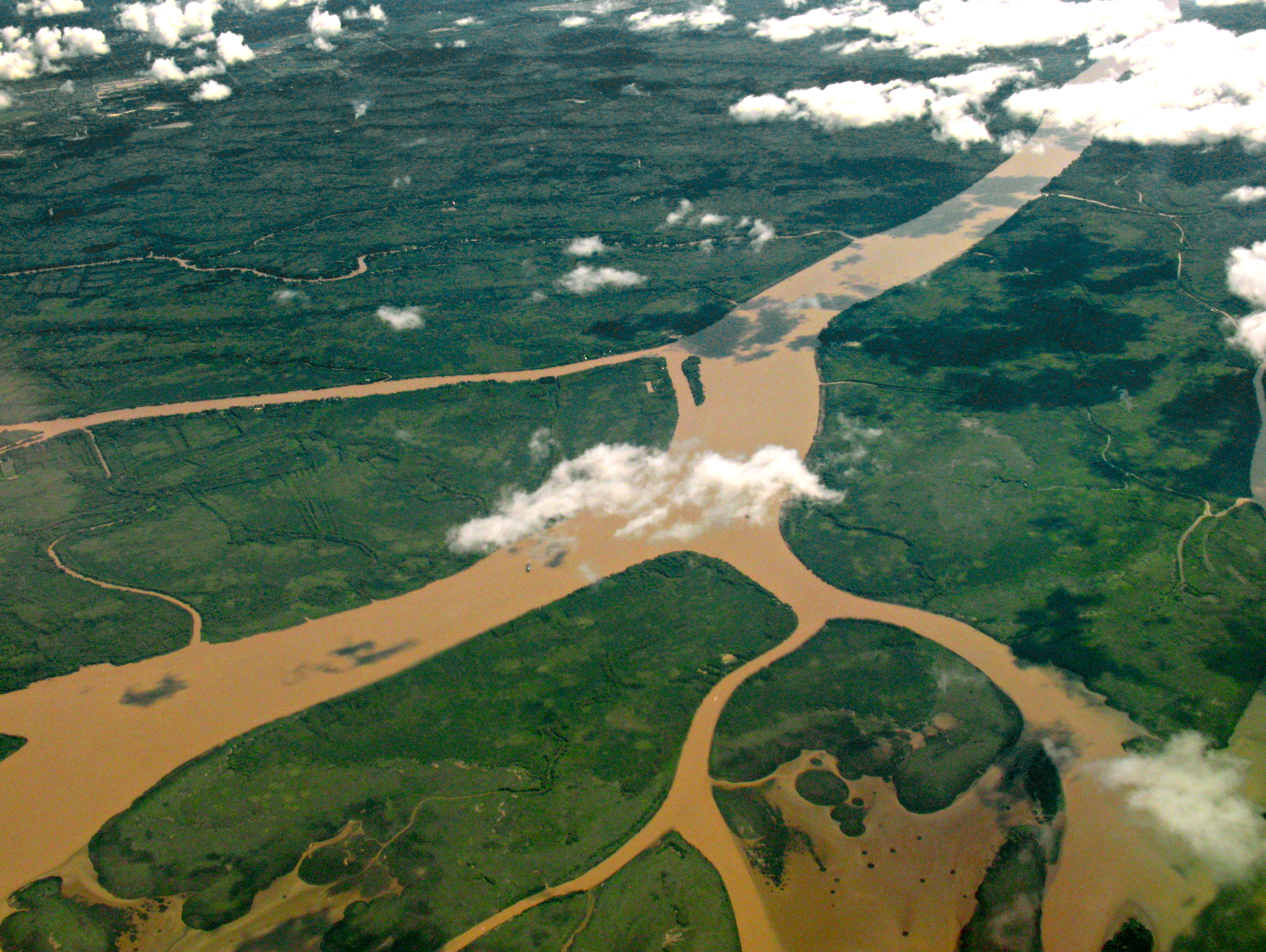
- Aerial view of the Lower Delta, north of Buenos Aires

Location
- Country: Argentina

Physical characteristics
- Length: 320 km (200 mi)
- Basin size: 14,000 square kilometres (5,400 sq mi)
- Discharge
  - average: 160 million tonnes per year (1.6×10^{11} kg/a), sediment

Ramsar Wetland
- Official name: Delta del Paraná
- Designated: 3 October 2015
- Reference no.: 2255

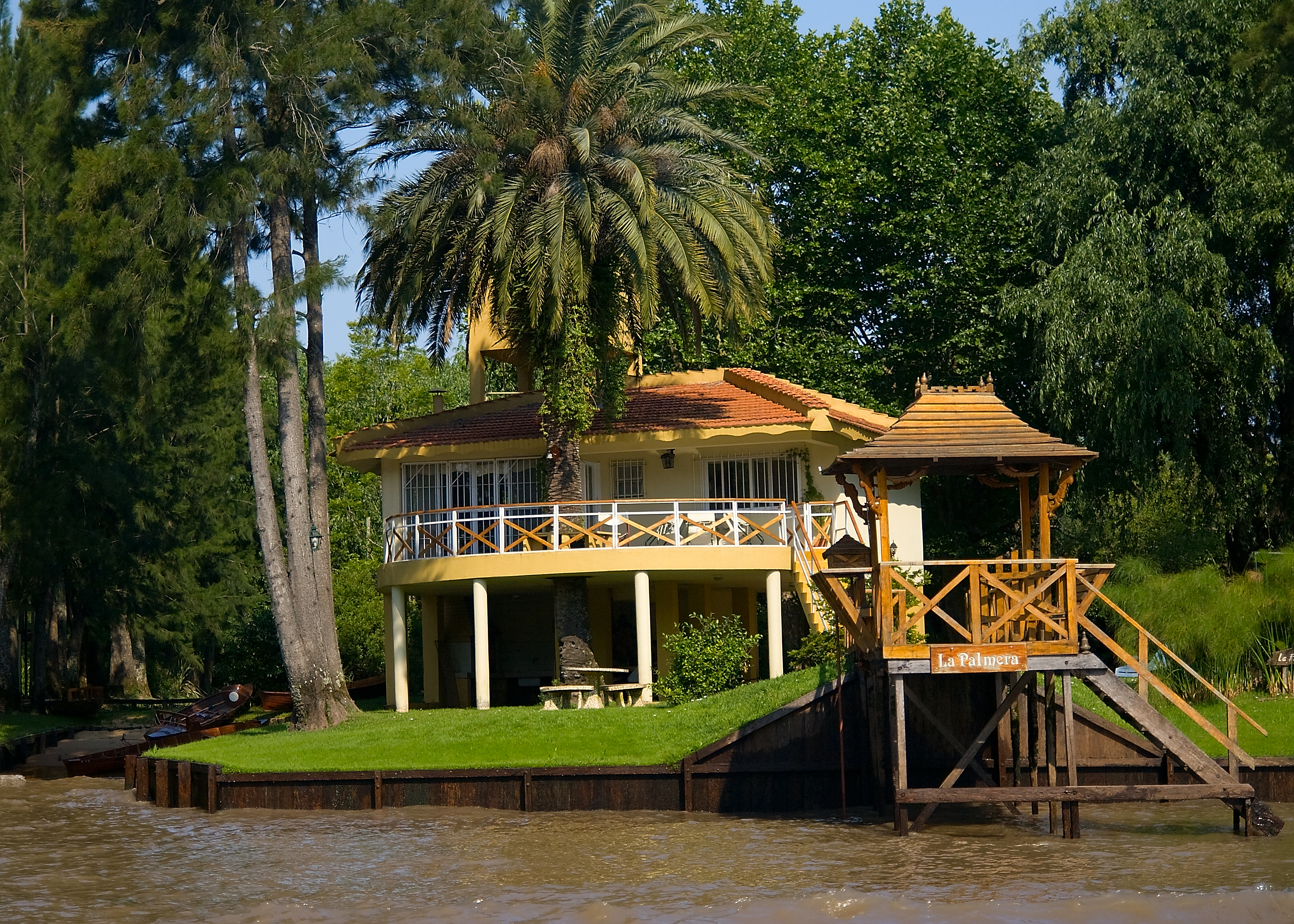
Boat dock-shed and typical house on stilts in Tigre, Buenos Aires (Lower Delta)

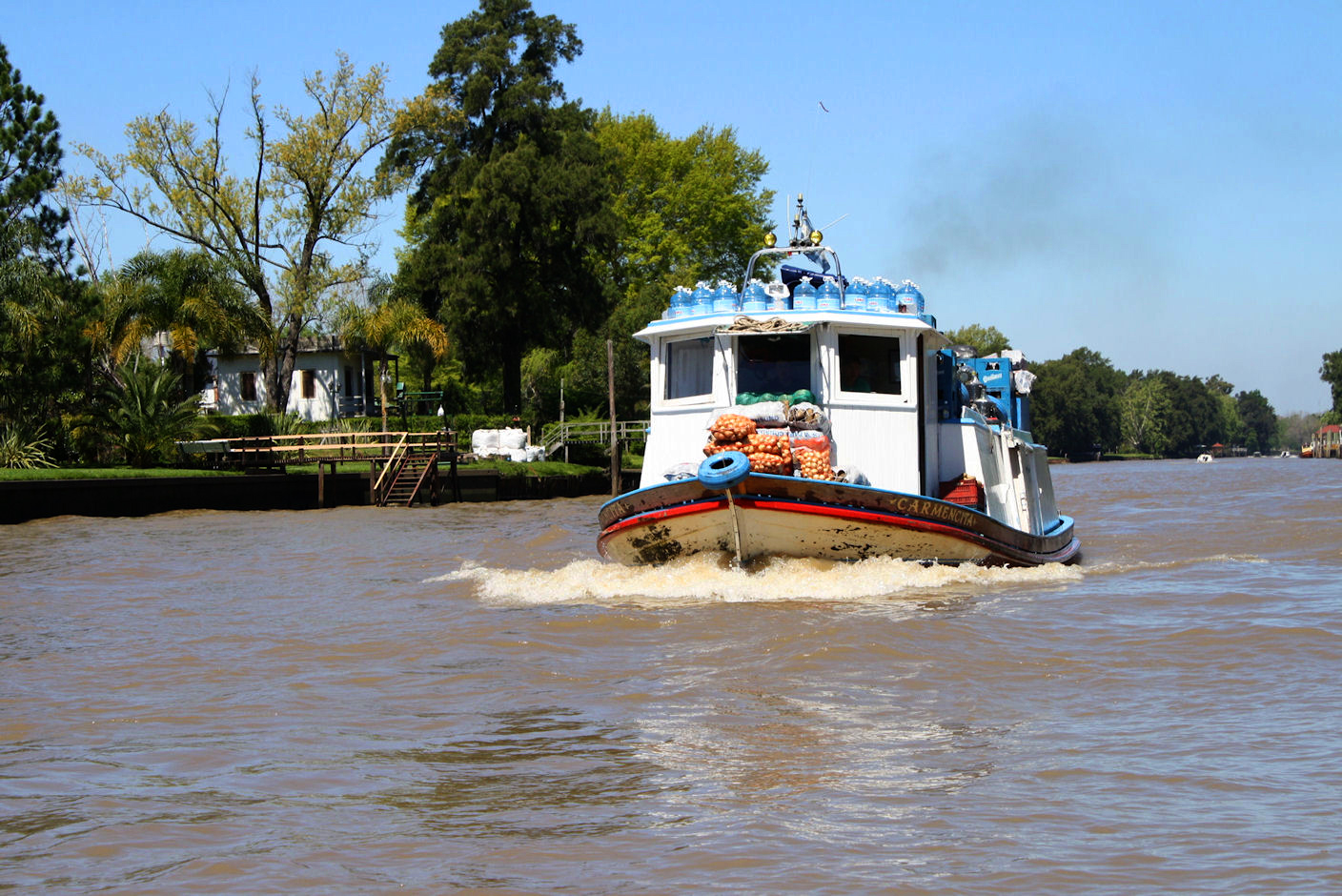
A characteristic provision barge in the Lower Delta

The Paraná Delta (Spanish: Delta del Paraná) is the delta of the Paraná River in Argentina and it consists of several islands known as the Islas del Paraná. The Paraná flows north–south and becomes an alluvial basin (a flood plain) between the Argentine provinces of Entre Ríos, Santa Fe and Buenos Aires then emptying into the Río de la Plata.

It covers about 14,000 square kilometres (5,400 mi^{2}) and starts to form between the cities of Santa Fe and Rosario, where the river splits into several arms, creating a network of islands and wetlands. Most of it is in the jurisdiction of Entre Ríos Province, and parts in the north of Buenos Aires Province.

The Paraná Delta is conventionally divided into three parts:

- the Upper Delta, from the Diamante – Puerto Gaboto line to Villa Constitución;
- The Middle Delta, from Villa Constitución to the Ibicuy Islands;
- The Lower Delta, from the Ibicuy Islands to the mouth of the river.

The total length of the delta is about 320 kilometres (200 mi), and its width varies between 18 and 60 kilometres (11 and 37 mi). It carries 160 million tonnes of suspended sediment (about half of it coming from the Bermejo River through the Paraguay River) and advances from 50 to 90 metres (160 to 300 ft) (depending on the source) per year over the Río de la Plata. It is the world's only river delta that is in contact not with the sea but with another river.

The Lower Delta was the site of the first modern settlements in the Paraná-Plata basin and is today densely populated, being the agricultural and industrial core of Argentina and host to several major ports. The main course of the Paraná lies to the west of the delta, and is navigable downstream from Puerto General San Martín by ships up to Panamax kind.

== Rivers of the delta ==
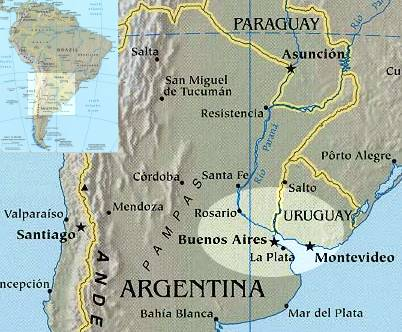
The Paraná Delta area, from south of Santa Fe, through Buenos Aires and beyond.

Among the many arms of the river are the Paraná Pavón, the Paraná Ibicuy, the Paraná de las Palmas, the Paraná Guazú and the smaller Paraná Miní and Paraná Bravo.

The Paraná Pavón is the first major branch. It has a meandering course that starts on the eastern side, opposite Villa Constitución. Between the main Paraná and the Paraná Pavón lie the Lechiguanas Islands. The Paraná Pavón flows east and then turns south to be continued by the Ibicuy, which itself gives origin to the smaller Paranacito River, a tributary of the Uruguay River that passes by Villa Paranacito.

The Paraná de las Palmas starts around the mouth of the Paraná Ibicuy, downstream from Baradero, flowing west into the province of Buenos Aires and then turning southeast again. The main course is continued by the other major branch, the Paraná Guazú. In turn, the Paraná Guazú sprouts two east-flowing branches in the territory of Entre Ríos: first the Paraná Bravo, and then the Paraná Miní.

== Climate ==
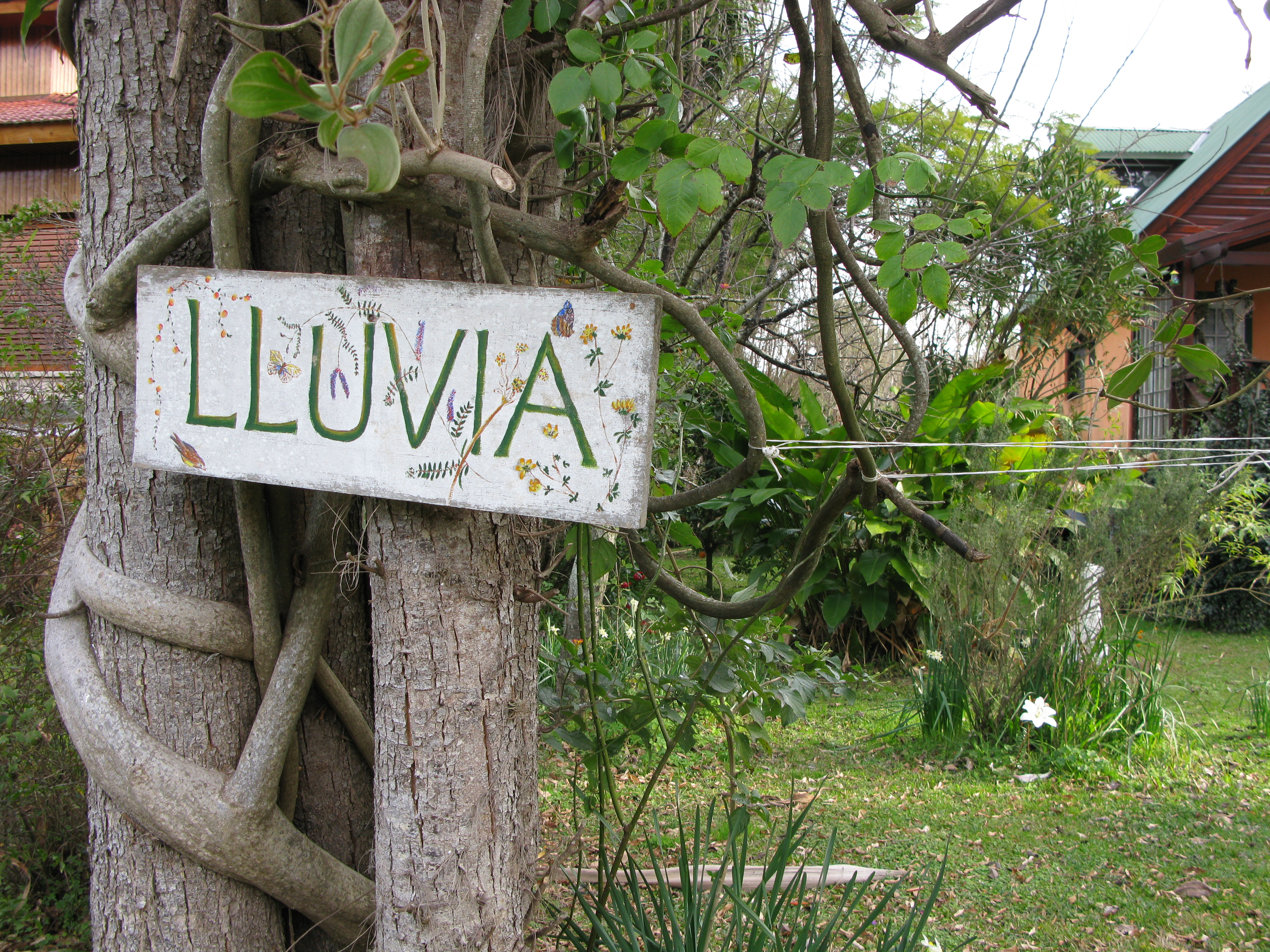
Each habitat in the Paraná Delta is named, not numbered.

Due to the low elevation and the ubiquitous presence of water, the Paraná delta is subject to a particular climate within the climate zones of the Pampas. As in the entire region, there are four distinct seasons; however, the Delta has slightly colder nights, milder winters, and higher humidity, which allows some warmer-weather species to thrive

Summers are hot and often muggy, with daily highs between 18 and 22 °C (64 and 72 °F) and nights between 16 and 20 °C (61 and 68 °F). Heat waves are common, yet they are not as intense as in central Argentina, and usually temperatures will not go much above 36 °C (97F), although they have reached 40 °C (104F) in the past. Thunderstorms are common and can bring heavy rain and much cooler weather. As in the entire Pampas region, summers are "cut" by short, cool periods when southerly Pampero winds blow.

March is already noticeably cooler than the summer, and April is characterized by very pleasant weather: highs range from 21 °C (70F) to 25 °C (77F), nights from 10 °C (50F) to 14 °C (57F), and May is already generally cool, with chilly nights.

Winter runs from late May to late August. Temperatures usually range from 13 °C (55F) to 18 °C (64F), while nights go from 3 °C (37F) to 7 °C (45F), with lower precipitation but higher cloudiness and relatively common fog. As in the entire Pampas region, there are often brief, mild spells in the winter when the temperatures might reach 25 °C (77F), followed by much colder weather and frosty nights. Temperatures usually reach 0 °C several times a year, yet they rarely fall much lower than -3 °C (27F), with record lows approaching -7 °C (19F). However, generally speaking, the windy, humid weather makes it feel significantly chillier than indicated by real temperatures.

Spring is usually delightful, yet very sudden changes may occur: summer-like and winter-like temperatures often alternate, and there may be a large difference between day and night temperatures. It is also the season most prone to violent weather. October has the same average temperatures as April, with slightly cooler nights, yet extremes of heat and cold are more likely: frost may rarely occur, as may temperatures of 35 °C (95F), sometimes within the same week.

Precipitation in the region ranges from 1,000 to 1,400 millimetres (39 to 55 in), with two peaks in late spring / early summer, and late summer / early fall, and a drier, yet cloudier winter.

== Ecology ==
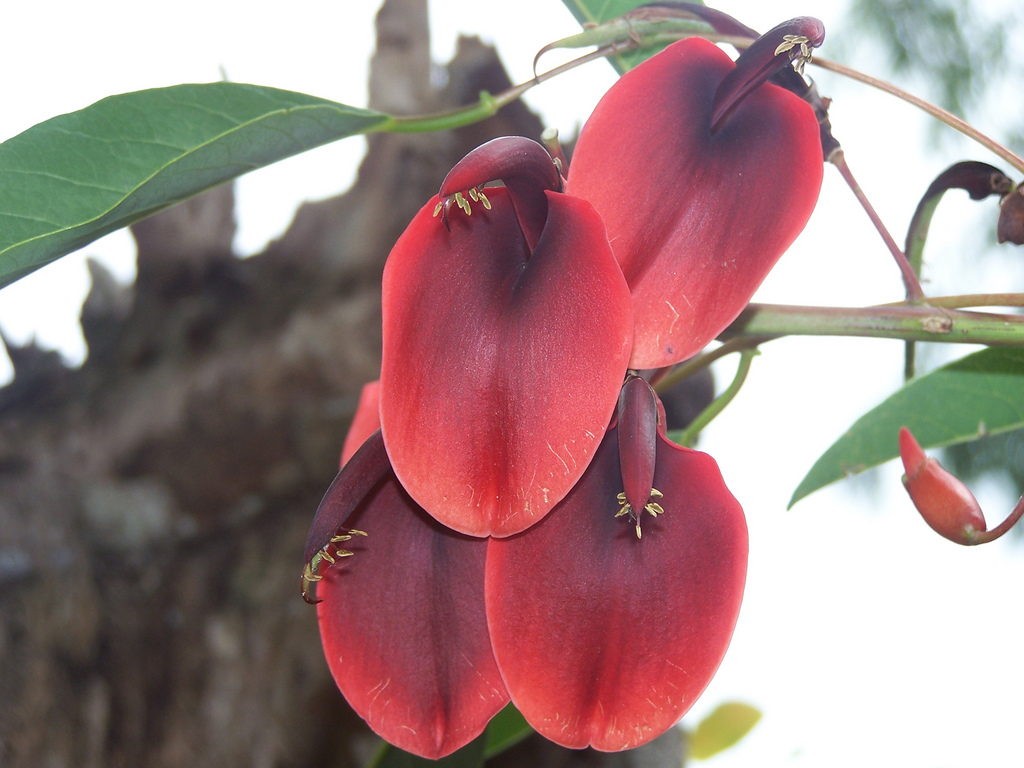
Ceibo blossoms

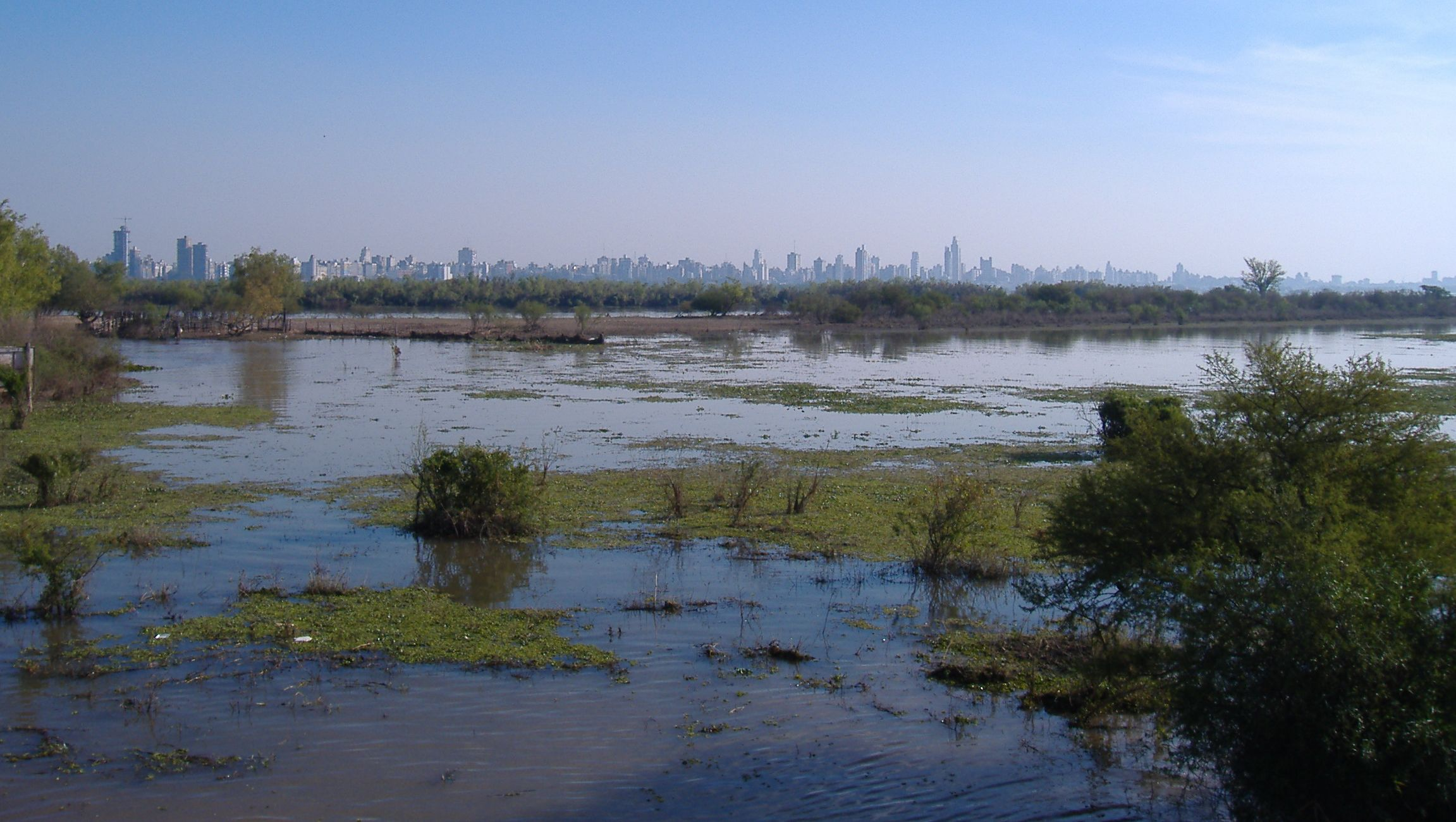
Semi-flooded islands in the Upper Delta, off the coast of Rosario

The flood plain of the river is part of the Paraná Delta and Islands Ecoregion. The original ecosystem, especially in the Lower Delta, has been heavily modified by deforestation, hunting, fishing, and the introduction of foreign species of flora, as well as damaged by domestic and industrial pollution. It hosts species such as the marsh deer, the capybara, the neotropical river otter, the Pampas cat, the jaguar, the coypu, and the red-faced guan, some of them endangered.

The delta has had large commercial forest plantations since the 1960s. The plantations show significant intra-annual variation in their normalized difference vegetation index (NDVI) for the 2008-2018 period. It is thought that this variation can be attributed to changes in river water level, temperature, and photoperiod, all of which change seasonally. Yet, part of the variation may be ultimately caused by El Niño and La Niña cycles.

=== Protected areas ===
The Isla Botija Nature Reserve was one of the first protected areas (1958) created in the low delta of the Parana River. The Predelta National Park, created in 1992, protects a sample of the Upper Delta. It is in the southwest of Entre Ríos, 6 kilometres (4 mi) south of Diamante, and has an area of 24.58 square kilometres (9.49 mi^{2}), occupied by low-lying islands subject to flooding, as well as lagoons and swamps.

The Paraná Delta Biosphere Reserve is composed of the second and third sections of the Islands of the San Fernando Delta, located just north of Buenos Aires. It was declared a natural reserve in 2000 by UNESCO. It takes up 886 square kilometres (342 mi^{2}), of which 106 square kilometres (41 mi^{2}) are the core protected area. It is an area rich in biodiversity, including species that find their southernmost limit of distribution, which makes the area interesting for the conservation of genetic diversity. The main human activity in this part of the delta is the exploitation of the willow forest for commercial purposes, and human impact is low. The region has suffered from a loss of human population and today there are only 3,600 inhabitants living there (2001). The establishment of the Biosphere Reserve aims at revitalizing the economy of the region at the same time as conserving the natural and cultural values of the area and support the investigation and study of the ecosystem with the possibilities of national and international investment in projects of sustainable growth and the grouping of the region in reference of organic cultivation and varied ways of land-forest production with certification of ecological quality.

== See also ==
- Isla Apipé
- Isla Entre Ríos
- Isla Martín García
- Tigre, Buenos Aires
- Villa Paranacito, Entre Ríos

== Bibliography ==
- (in Spanish) Todo Argentina, Provincia de Entre Ríos. Área Natural Delta del Paraná
- (in Spanish) Partido de Tigre, Geografía. El Delta del Paraná
- (in Spanish) Diamante-Coronda. [htiopp0060501024923/http://www.lahueya.com.ar/index/parques/deltadelparana.htm Área Natural Delta del Paraná]
- (in Spanish) ArgentinaXplora. Reserva de Biosfera Delta del Paraná
- (in Spanish) SiOL.net. El Río Paraná
- (in Spanish) Prof. Roberto F. Bó. Grupo de Investigaciones en Ecología de Humedales (GIEH). Laboratorio de Ecología Regional. Departamento de Ecología, Genética y Evolución. Facultad de Ciencias Exactas y Naturales (FCEN), Universidad de Buenos Aires (UBA). Ecorregión Delta e Islas del Paraná.
- (in Spanish) Administración de Parques Nacionales. Parque Nacional Predelta.
