= El Paranacito =

- Municipality and village
- Location in Argentina
- Coordinates: 27°39′03″S 58°53′57″W
- Country: Argentina
- Province: Chaco Province
- Time zone: UTC−3 (ART)

El Paranacito, also Villa Paranacito, is a village and municipality in Argentina located in the department of San Fernando in the southeast of Chaco.

It is named after the arm of the Paraná River on which it is located.

== Tourism ==
The river attracts many Resistencia residents in the summer for its spa area. Other popular activities include boating, camping, and grilling.

== See also ==
- Villa Paranacito
