= San Antonio de Itatí =

San Antonio de Itatí Sán António Itatĩ Pegua
- Town
- Location of San Antonio de Itatí in Argentina
- Coordinates: 27°33′S 57°32′W
- Country: Argentina
- Province: Corrientes
- Department: Berón de Astrada
- Elevation: 55 m (180 ft)

Population
  - Total: 2,294
- Time zone: UTC−3 (ART)
- CPA base: W3481
- Dialing code: +54 3781

San Antonio de Itatí (Guarani: Sán António Itatĩ Pegua) is a town in Corrientes Province, Argentina. It is the head town of the Berón de Astrada Department. Between 1910 and 2013 the municipality had the name Berón de Astrada.
