= Islas del Ibicuy Department =

- Department
- Location of Islas del Ibicuy Department within Entre Ríos Province
- Coordinates: 33°42′49″S 58°39′53″W
- Country: Argentina
- Province: Entre Ríos
- Head town: Villa Paranacito

Area
  - Total: 4,500 km^{2} (1,700 sq mi)

Population (2022)
  - Total: 14,000
  - Density: 3.1/km^{2} (8.1/sq mi)
- Time zone: UTC-3 (ART)

The Islas del Ibicuy Department (in Spanish, Departamento Islas del Ibicuy) is an administrative subdivision (departamento) of the province of Entre Ríos, Argentina. It is the ninth largest in the province with 4,500 km^{2} and the least populated, with 14,000 inhabitants according to the 2022 census.

== Localities ==
- Ceibas
- Médanos, Entre Ríos
- Ñancay
- Puerto Ibicuy
- Villa Paranacito
