= Villa Paranacito =

- Town
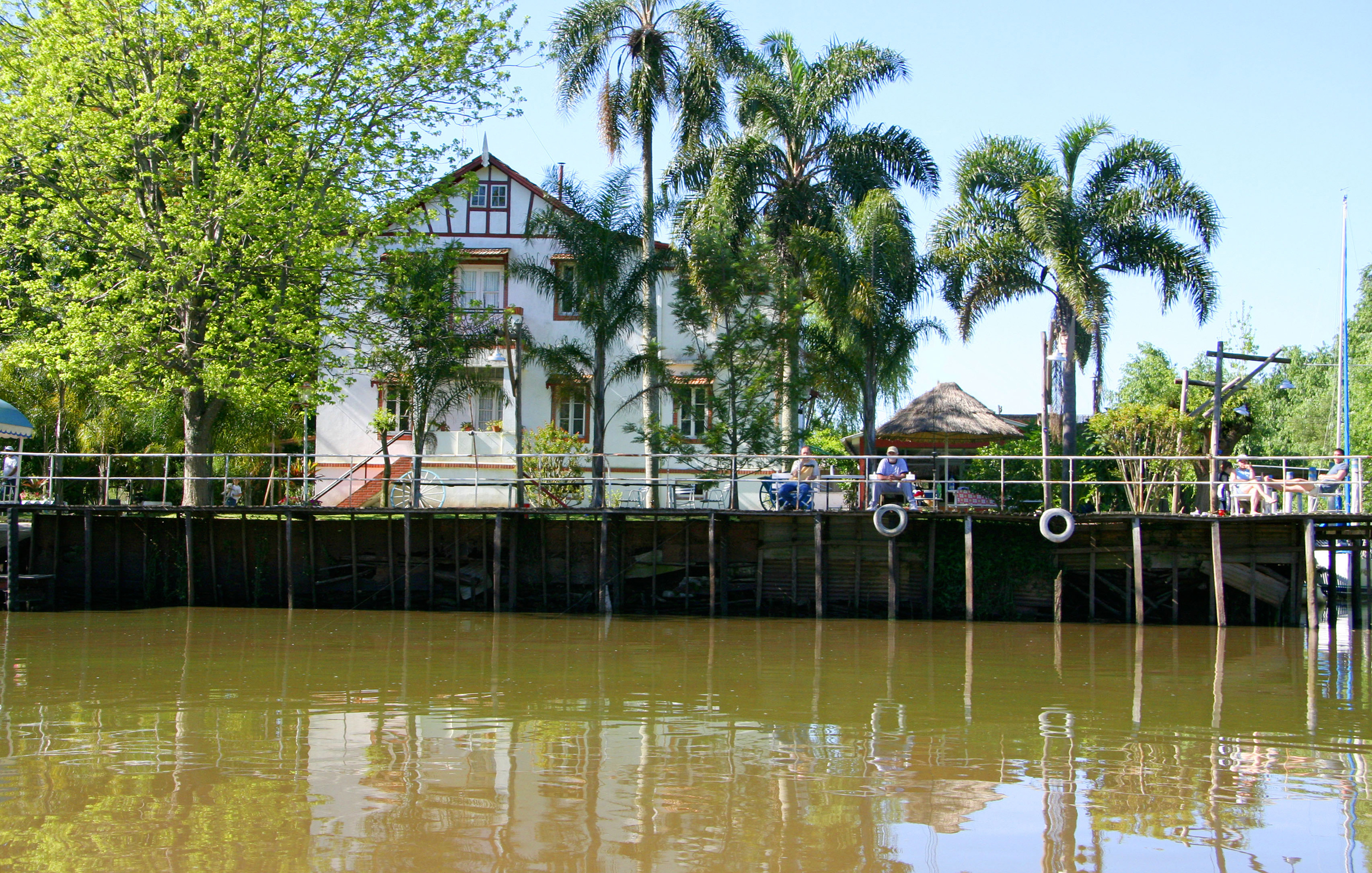
- Rose Marie guest house deep in the Paraná Delta at low tide

- Location of Villa Paranacito in Argentina
- Coordinates: 33°42′S 58°41′W
- Country: Argentina
- Province: Entre Ríos
- Department: Islas del Ibicuy

Government
  - Mayor: Carmen Toller (Justicialist Party)

Population
  - Total: 3,998
- Time zone: UTC−3 (ART)
- CPA base: E2823
- Dialing code: +54 3446

Villa Paranacito is a town in the southeast corner of the province of Entre Ríos, Argentina, head town of the Islas del Ibicuy Department. It is located in the third section of the delta at the heart of the low-lying Ibicuy Islands in the Paraná Delta and is the administrative centre for the dispersed inhabitants of the islands and the delta's timber producers. Many of the town's inhabitants live on outlying islands, and several thousand more live across the whole group of islands.

== History and tourism ==
The town was officially founded on 25 May 1906 and was settled by European colonists, many from central and eastern Europe. Communication with the rest of the province was originally by boat, principally boats to Campana and San Fernando in Buenos Aires and the occasional steamboat to Gualeguaychú. In 1937 "hopscotch" dirt roads arrived and in 1971 the town was connected to a supply of electricity. Amateur radio is still in use today. Formerly, the third section was populated by island cottages nestled amidst well-manicured gardened parks and by Travelers Rest Guesthouses (Inns) for recreation and lodging. Some still stand radiating the charm of a bygone era, well known where Lietuva, Sagastume and Carlos Jahn in Arroyo Martínez, once they were used by the sport fishermen who indulged themselves in this paradise where fish of all type, specially golden dorado, surubíes, chafalotes, tarariras and boga thrived.

Until recently it was possible to get here by commuter boats, the Galofré line had been doing it since the early 1930s, they would start from either Tigre and/or from the San Fernando channels in Buenos Aires, the journey took all of Saturday morning and the return trip most of Sunday afternoon, it crossed the majestic Paraná River and the most inhospitable sections of the delta until finally arriving at Villa Paranacito, sandwiches and refreshments in white-clad servers where served on board.

Nowadays you may get there by bus or car, located at 182 km from Buenos Aires, through the Zárate-Brazo Largo Bridge, turning off the highway, the last stretch being unpaved pebbled road. Within the epicenter of Villa Paranacito, several guest accommodations are still available that are used mainly for recreational activities. The one furthest apart which conserves a remarkable nostalgic air and is accessed by water taxi is Hostería Rose Marie, name of the daughter of a Hungarian who was proprietor of so beautiful large house constructed in the first decade of the twentieth century, strategically located in an area well known for fishing, just a short distance from the mouth of Arroyo Martínez.

A very peculiar custom with folks that reside along the rivers is the delivery of mail, with a long cane which has a groove in the end where mail is attached, the boat without stopping by the pier delivers the mail to the hand of the islander (or vice versa) with no need to berth the ship on pier, this "marine mail delivery" has been a long tradition in the delta.

Villa Paranacito is a base to explore the Paraná Delta. A small tourist office is located in the town.

== See also ==
- Tigre, Buenos Aires
- Villa Paranacito, Chaco
