= Predelta National Park =

National park in Argentina

- IUCN category II (national park)
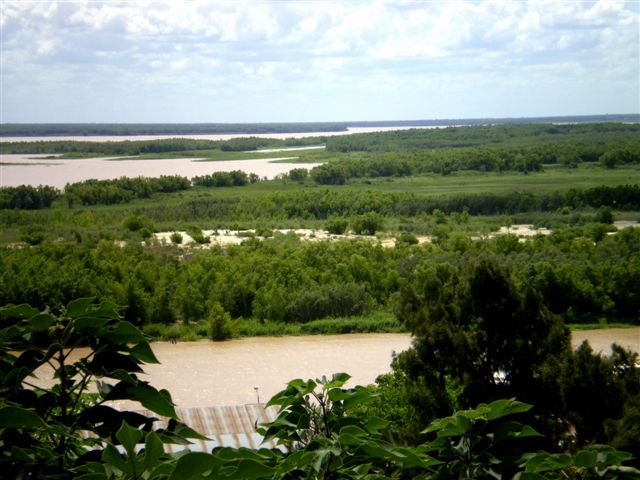
- Parque Nacional Predelta

- Location within Argentina
- Location: Entre Ríos Province, Argentina
- Nearest city: Diamante
- Coordinates: 32°9′S 60°38′W
- Area: 24.58 km^{2} (9.49 sq mi)
- Established: 1992
- Governing body: Administración de Parques Nacionales

The Predelta National Park (Spanish: Parque Nacional Predelta) is a national park of Argentina, located in south-west of the province of Entre Ríos, 6 km south from Diamante, in the Argentine Mesopotamia, at the beginning of the Paraná River Delta. The park was created on 13 January 1992 under the Law Nº 24.063, with an area 24.58 square kilometres to protect a sample of the Upper Delta of the Paraná, which belongs to the Paraná Delta and Islands Ecoregion. The Predelta is the area where the sediments of the Paraná start forming islands, while the river itself splits into several major arms and many smaller watercourses.

Map of Parque Nacional Predelta

== Sources ==
- Administración de Parques Nacionales - National Parks Administration of Argentina
