= Alicia Azula =

Argentine politician

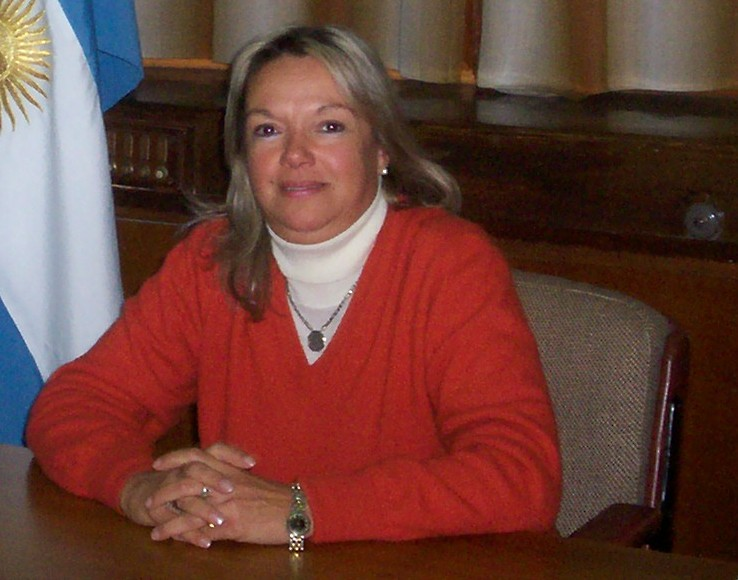

Graciela Alicia Digiuni de Azula (born 16 May 1957), is an Argentine politician in the Radical Civic Union. By profession Professor in pre-elementary education, was elected mayoress (intendente) three times for the city of Barranqueras.

== Life ==
She was born in Resistencia, Chaco on 16 May 1957, and got the title of electromechanical technician and of professor in pre-elementary education from National University of the Northeast. She worked as teacher of Secondary Education in Educational Sciences Between 1999 and 2001 was Secretary of Government of the Municipality until she was chosen councilwomen of the city in October 2001 until 2002. Azula was elected Mayor of Barranqueras in 2003, and again re-elected twice more.
