= Isla Entre Ríos =

Uninhabited Argentinian island

Entre Ríos Island
- Location within Argentina

Geography
- Location: South America
- Coordinates: 27°25′15″S 57°29′15″W
- Length: 19 km (11.8 mi)
- Width: 3.75 km (2.33 mi)
- Highest elevation: 61 m (200 ft)

Administration
- Argentina
- Province: Corrientes
- Department: Berón de Astrada

Demographics
- Population: Uninhabited

Entre Ríos Island (Spanish: Isla Entre Ríos 'Between Rivers Island') is an uninhabited island in the Paraná Delta that constitutes an exclave of Argentina in waters belonging to Paraguay. It is part of the municipality of Berón de Astrada, which covers the entire Berón de Astrada Department in the north of Corrientes Province, Mesopotamia.

== Geography ==
Entre Ríos Island is located in a widening of the Paraná River between the localities of Yahapé (to the west) and Itá Ibaté (to the east). On its southern side, the Paraná River separates it from the rest of the Corrientes Province and Santa Isabel Island, constituting the fluvial limit between Argentina and Paraguay, located in the middle of its current, as it is the deepest branch of the Paraná River there. In this branch, there are another 10 islets belonging to the archipelago that forms the Entre Ríos Island, all of them Argentinean property. On its northern side, another branch of the Paraná River separates it from a group of Paraguayan islands, the closest of which is 200 meters northwest of Entre Ríos Island.

The maximum length of the island is 19 km and its maximum width is 3.75 km in the center of the island. It is at a maximum height of 61 meters above sea level, reaching about 8 m above river level at its highest point.

In the past, the island was home to a Paraguayan Navy detachment, but after its adjudication to Argentina, it has remained uninhabited. It is covered with marshes and swamps that form small lagoons and furrows of old canals.

== History ==
After the end of the War of the Triple Alliance, both countries signed three treaties on February 3, 1876, one of them on limits, whose ratifications were exchanged on September 13, 1876. Among other things, the treaty established the boundary between the two countries on the Paraná River.

At the meeting of the mixed commission on 22 June 1995, it was stated that the measurements carried out proved that the island of Entre Ríos should belong to Argentina, but the Paraguayan delegation declared itself incompetent to decide on its allocation, pointing out that the island had always been used by Paraguayan citizens, including a detachment of the Paraguayan navy, and that it was also known by the Guaraní name of Guazú' due to the Paraguayan occupation. On that day, the commission approved the charter corresponding to the sector of the island with regard to the river boundary and the adjudication of the other islands, but the sovereignty of Entre Ríos Island remained undefined, which the Paraguayan delegation passed on to the jurisdiction of its foreign ministry.

At the meeting of the mixed commission on 21 August 1996, the pending adjudication of the islands was resolved in accordance with the instructions received from both foreign ministries, by which Paraguay recognized Argentine sovereignty over Entre Ríos Island in exchange for Argentine recognition of Talavera Island and the islands of the Jesuit Channel as Paraguayan.

On 18 June 1997, the two countries exchanged reversal notes reiterating the right of each side to access by water and air to any point of the enclaved islands that each country owns in the waters of the other.

== See also ==
- Argentina–Paraguay border
- Ibicuy Islands
- Isla Apipé
- Isla de San Martín
- Isla Grande de Tierra del Fuego
- Isla Martín García
- Tierra del Fuego
- List of enclaves and exclaves
