= Berón de Astrada Department =

Berón de Astrada Department Departamento Berón de Astrada (Spanish) Tetãvore Veron Astrada Pegua (Guarani)
- Department
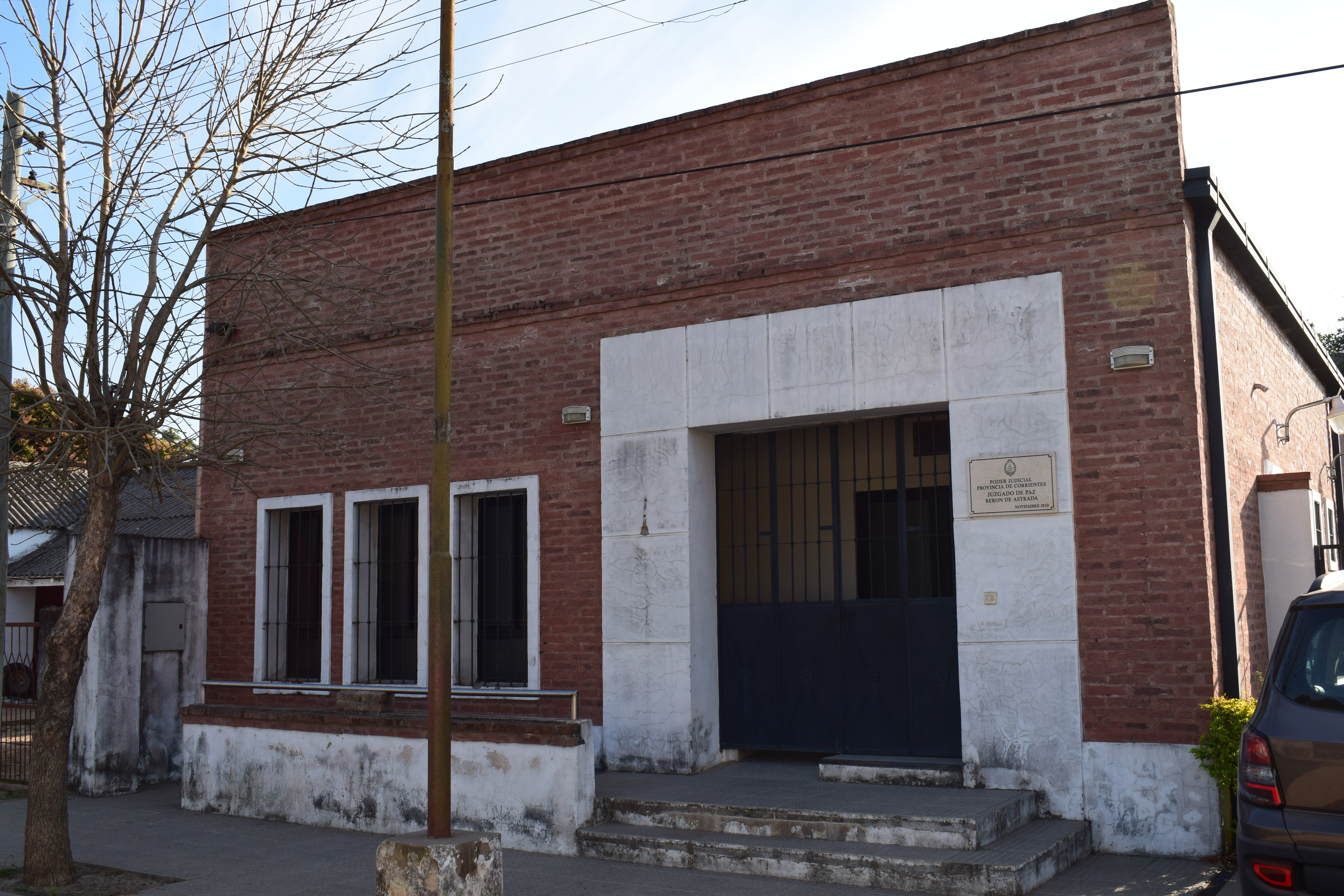
- Justice of the Peace in the department of Berón de Astrada

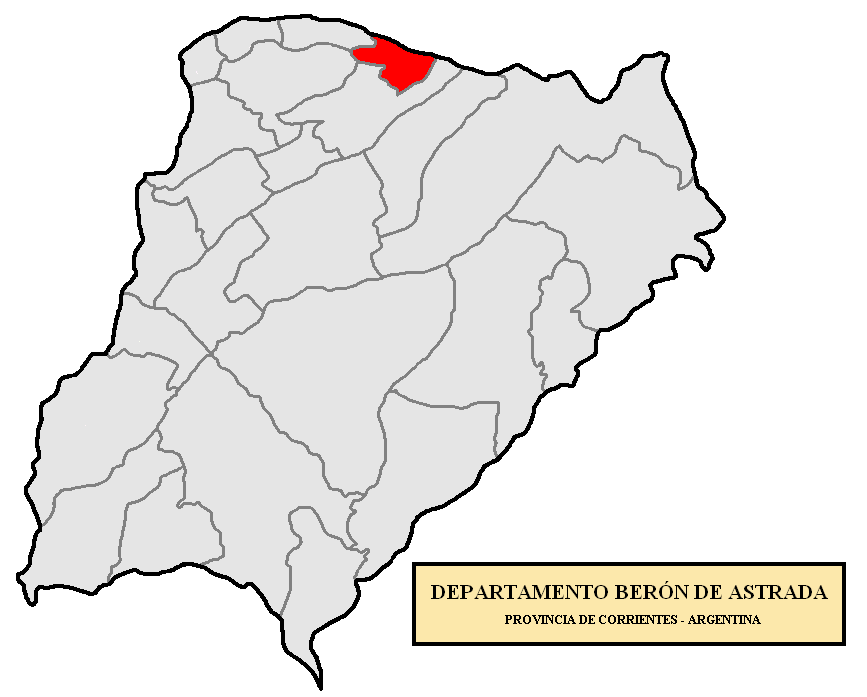
- location of Berón de Astrada Department in Corrientes Province
- Coordinates: 27°33′S 57°32′W
- Country: Argentina
- Seat: Berón de Astrada

Area
  - Total: 804 km^{2} (310 sq mi)

Population (2001 census [INDEC])
  - Total: 2,294
  - Density: 2.85/km^{2} (7.39/sq mi)
- Postal Code: W3481
- Area Code: 03781

Berón de Astrada Department is a department of Corrientes Province in Argentina.

The provincial subdivision has a population of about 2,294 inhabitants in an area of 804 km^{2} (310 sq mi), and its capital city is Berón de Astrada, which is located around 1,116 km (693 mi) from Capital Federal.

== Settlements ==
- Berón de Astrada
- Yahapé

== Islands ==
- Isla Entre Ríos
