= Barranqueras =

- City
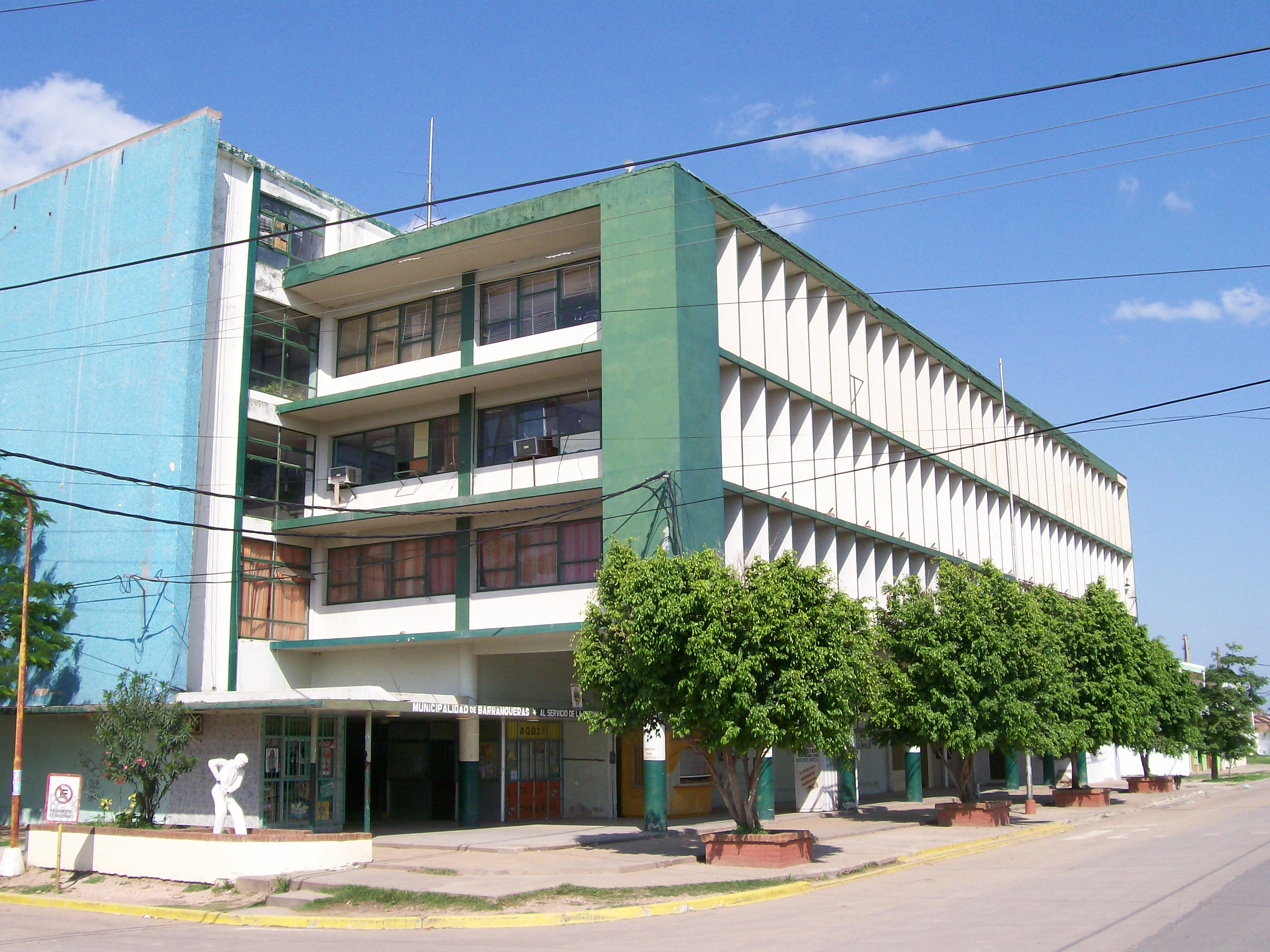
- Barranqueras town hall

- Location of Barranqueras in Argentina
- Coordinates: 27°29′S 58°56′W
- Country: Argentina
- Province: Chaco
- Department: San Fernando

Population (2010 census)
  - Total: 54,698
- Time zone: UTC−3 (ART)
- CPA base: H3503
- Dialing code: +54 3722

Barranqueras is a city in the southeast of the province of Chaco, Argentina, on a small tributary river on the right-hand-side (western) shore of the Paraná River, only 7 km from the provincial capital Resistencia and within its metropolitan area. It has over 50,000 inhabitants according to the 2001 census [INDEC], being the third most populated city in the province.

Barranqueras is located in a commercial node of the Mercosur, and has a port on Kilometer 1,198 of the Paraná, managed by the provincial state since 1991.

Alicia Azula was elected Mayor of Barranqueras in 2003 and she was re-elected twice more.
