= Basail =

Coordinates: 27°52′S 59°18′W

- Municipality and village
- Interactive map of Basail
- Country: Argentina
- Province: Chaco Province
- Time zone: UTC−3 (ART)

Basail is a village and municipality in Chaco Province in northern Argentina.
