= Ceibas =

- Municipality and village
- Interactive map of Ceibas
- Coordinates: 33°29′59.23″S 58°48′2.89″W
- Country: Argentina
- Province: Entre Ríos Province
- Department: Islas del Ibicuy
- Elevation: 56 ft (17 m)

Population (2001)
  - Total: 1,405
- Time zone: UTC−3 (ART)
- CPA base: E2823
- Area code: +54 3446

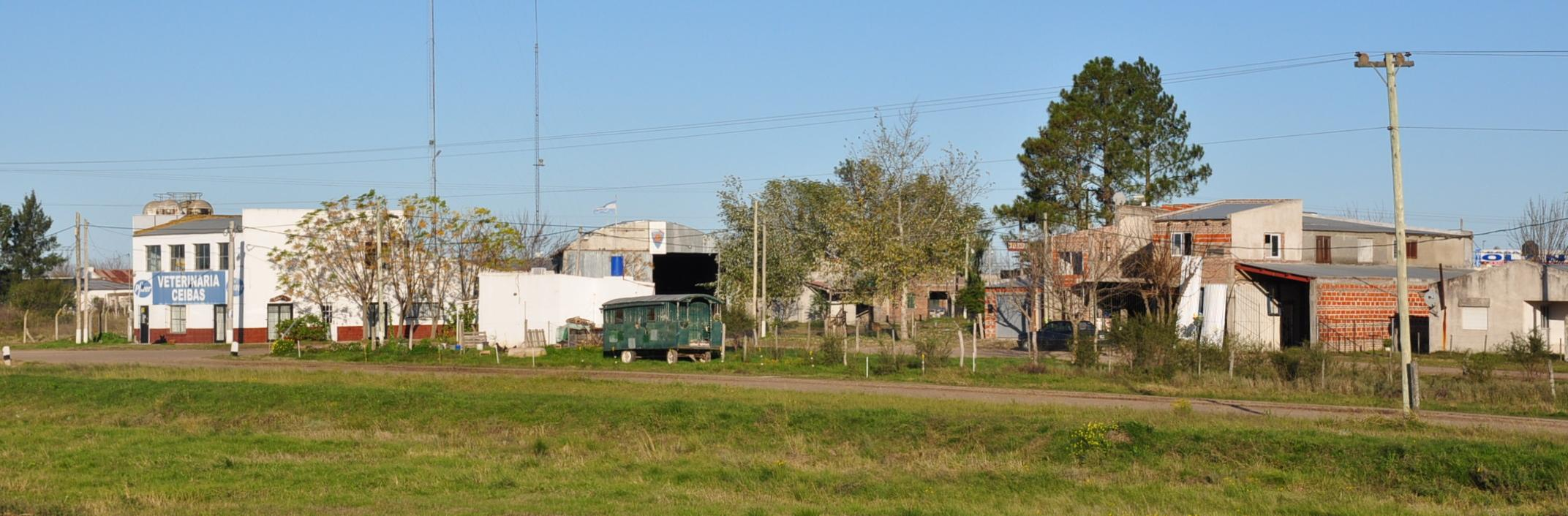
Ceibas, seen from Ruta Nacional 12.

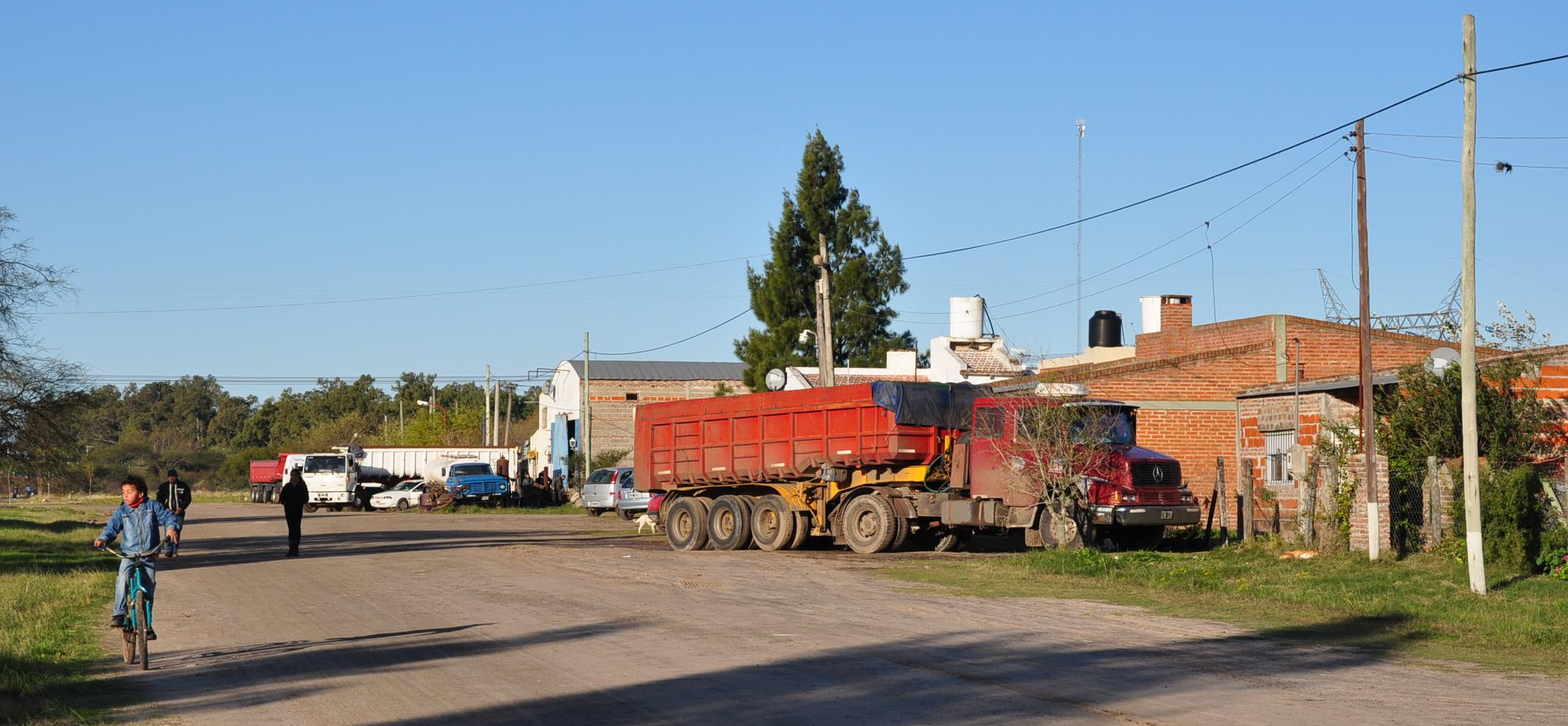
Late afternoon in Ceibas.

Ceibas is a village and municipality in Entre Ríos Province in north-eastern Argentina. It is split in two halves by Ruta Nacional 12, while Ruta Nacional 14 (Argentina's main road to Brazil) starts here. The village is totally dominated by this large and important highway junction.

Ceibas is a diverse area mostly consisting savannah grassland complemented by patches of humid grassland (the famous "Pampas"), reed beds and riverside native forest.

Ceibas is 156 km from Buenos Aires.
