= Isla Apipé =

Island in Corrientes Province, Argentina

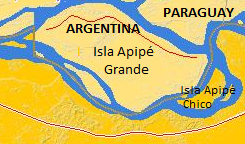
- Map of island and the three others, showing approximately their greatest size when the river is low. The borders are quite clear on this map

- Location within Paraguay Location within Argentina
- Interactive map of Isla Apipé

Geography
- Coordinates: 27°30′S 56°54′W
- Adjacent to: Paraná River

Administration
- Argentina
- Province: Corrientes

Isla Apipé or Isla Apipé Grande is an Argentine island about 25 km long in the Paraná River below the Argentine city of Posadas, Misiones, very marginally within the Argentina–Paraguay border, divided by river and a thin strip of variable marsh depending on the season.

== Geography ==
Isla Apipé is part of Corrientes Province, separated from the rest of the province by a channel of the Paraná River and marsh up to the mean high water mark along a longer strip of the left bank belonging to Paraguay, a country which otherwise commences on the other side of the island. The island and three smaller notable, permanent islands are surrounded by Paraguay — being exclaves and enclaves. The other islands are the Isla Apipé Chico, Isla Los Patos and Isla San Martín. In order, the four islands measure about 276, 23.8, 11.8 and 3.7 km².
