= Rivadavia =

Rivadavia may refer to:

== Places ==
=== Argentina ===
==== Populated places ====
- Comodoro Rivadavia, city in Chubut Province
- Rivadavia, Mendoza, city in Mendoza Province
- Rivadavia, Salta, town in Salta Province
- Rivadavia, San Juan, city in San Juan Province
- Rivadavia, Santa Fe, city in Santa Fe Province

==== Departments ====
- Rivadavia Department (disambiguation)

==== other ====
- Rivadavia Avenue (one of Buenos Aires' most important thoroughfares)
- Rivadavia-class battleship (Argentina's first and only class of dreadnought battleship)
- ARA Rivadavia, the first of its class, at the time of its 1911 launch, the world's largest battleship
- Lake Rivadavia, in Los Alerces National Park
- Club Rivadavia, Argentine football club from Lincoln, Buenos Aires

== People ==
- Bernardino Rivadavia (the first president of Argentina)
