= Alto de la Sierra =

- Village
- Coordinates: 22°44′S 62°30′W
- Country: Argentina
- Province: Salta Province
- Department: Rivadavia
- Elevation: 587 ft (179 m)

Population (2001)
  - Total: 781
- Time zone: UTC−3 (ART)
- Post code: A4561
- Area Code: 0387
- Climate: Cwa

Alto de la Sierra is a village and rural municipality in Salta Province within the Rivadavia department in northwestern Argentina. Much of the population is aboriginal, engaged mainly in small-scale farming.

== Location ==
Alto de la Sierra is located over 50 km southeast of the town of Santa Victoria Este, through a path that connects to the Formosan town of General Mosconi.

== Population ==
Alto de la Sierra had 781 inhabitants (INDEC, 2001). In the previous census of 1991, the area was listed as a dispersed rural population.
