= Climate of Argentina =

Köppen climate classification map of Argentina

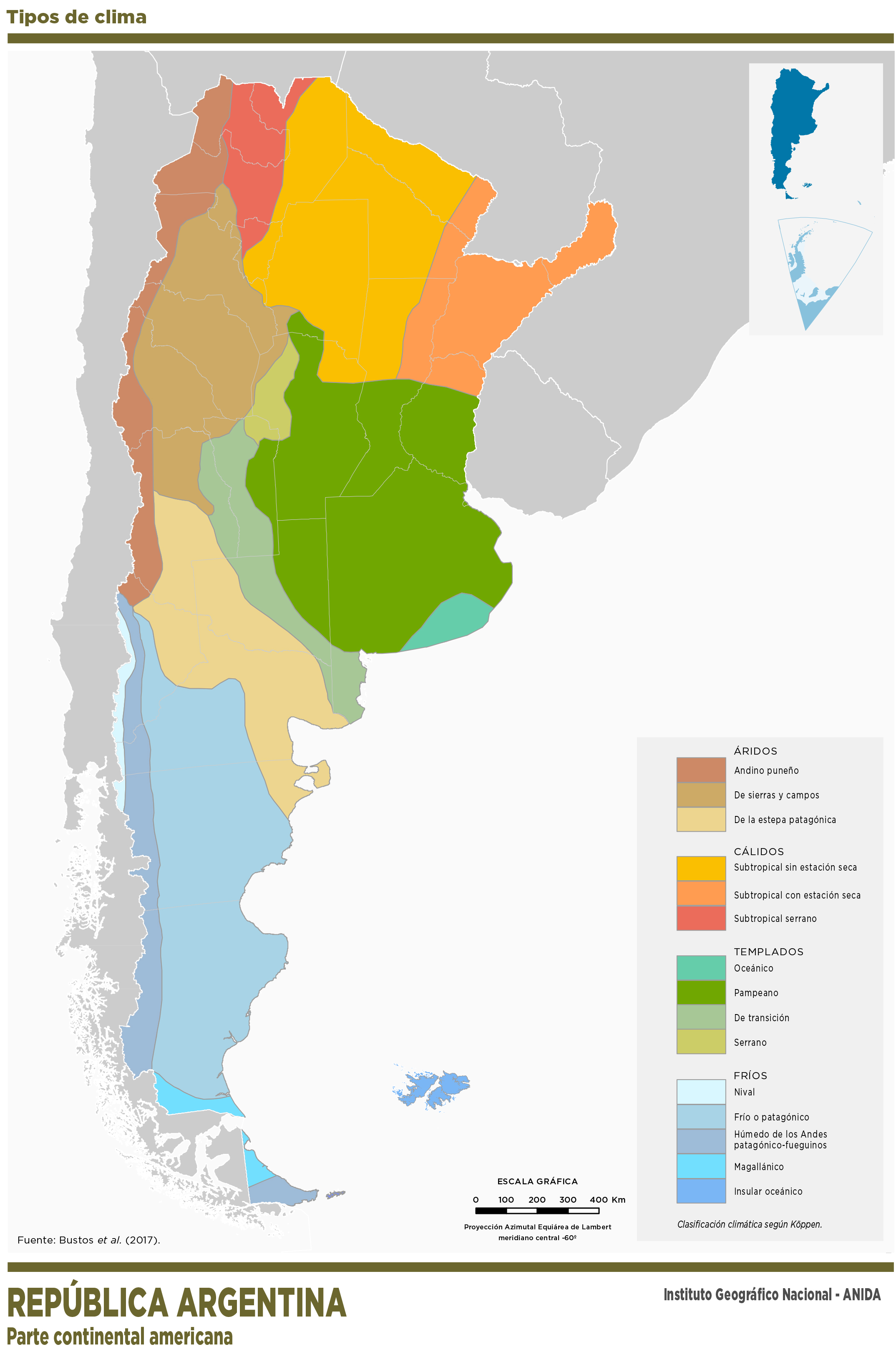
Climate zones within Argentina. (Note: Argentina claims sovereignty over part of Antarctica and the Falkland Islands. However, territorial claims in Antarctica are suspended by the Antarctic Treaty while the United Kingdom exercises de facto control of the Falkland islands)

The climate of Argentina varies from region to region, as the vast size of the country and wide variation in altitude make for a wide range of climate types. Summers are the warmest and wettest season in most of Argentina, except for most of Patagonia, where it is the driest season. The climate is warm and tropical in the north, mild in the center, and cold in the southern parts, that experience frequent frost and snow. Because the southern parts of the country are moderated by the surrounding oceans, the cold is less intense and prolonged than areas at similar latitudes in the Northern Hemisphere. Spring and autumn are transition seasons that generally feature mild weather.

Many regions have different, often contrasting microclimates. In general, the northern parts of the country are characterized by hot, humid, rainy summers and mild winters with periodic droughts. Mesopotamia, in the northeast is characterized by high temperatures and abundant precipitation throughout the year with droughts being uncommon. West of this lies the Chaco region, which is the warmest region in Argentina. Precipitation in the Chaco region decreases westwards, resulting in the vegetation changing from forests in the east to shrubs in the west. Northwest Argentina is predominantly dry and hot although the rugged topography makes it climatically diverse, ranging from the cold, dry Puna to thick jungles. The center of the country, which includes the Pampas to the east and the drier Cuyo region to the west has hot summers with frequent tornadoes and thunderstorms, and cool, dry winters. Patagonia, in the southern parts of the country has a dry climate with warm summers and cold winters characterized by strong winds throughout the year and one of the strongest precipitation gradients in the world. High elevations at all latitudes experience cooler conditions, and the mountainous zones can see heavy snowfall.

The geographic and geomorphic characteristics of Argentina tend to create extreme weather conditions, often leading to natural disasters that negatively impact the country both economically and socially. The Pampas, where many of the large cities are located, has a flat topography and poor water drainage, making it vulnerable to flooding. Severe storms can lead to tornadoes, damaging hail, storm surges, and high winds, causing extensive damage to houses and infrastructure, displacing thousands of people and causing significant loss of life. Extreme temperature events such as heat waves and cold waves impact rural and urban areas by negatively impacting agriculture, one of the main economic activities of the country, and by increasing energy demand, which can lead to energy shortages.

Argentina is vulnerable and will likely be significantly impacted by climate change. Temperatures have increased in the last century while the observed changes in precipitation are variable, with some areas receiving more and other areas less. These changes have impacted river flow, increased the frequency of extreme weather events, and led to the retreat of glaciers. Based on the projections for both precipitation and temperatures, these climatic events are likely to increase in severity and create new problems associated with climate change in the country.

== Seasons ==
In Argentina, the climate is divided into four, well defined seasons, those being winter, spring, summer and autumn.

=== Winter ===
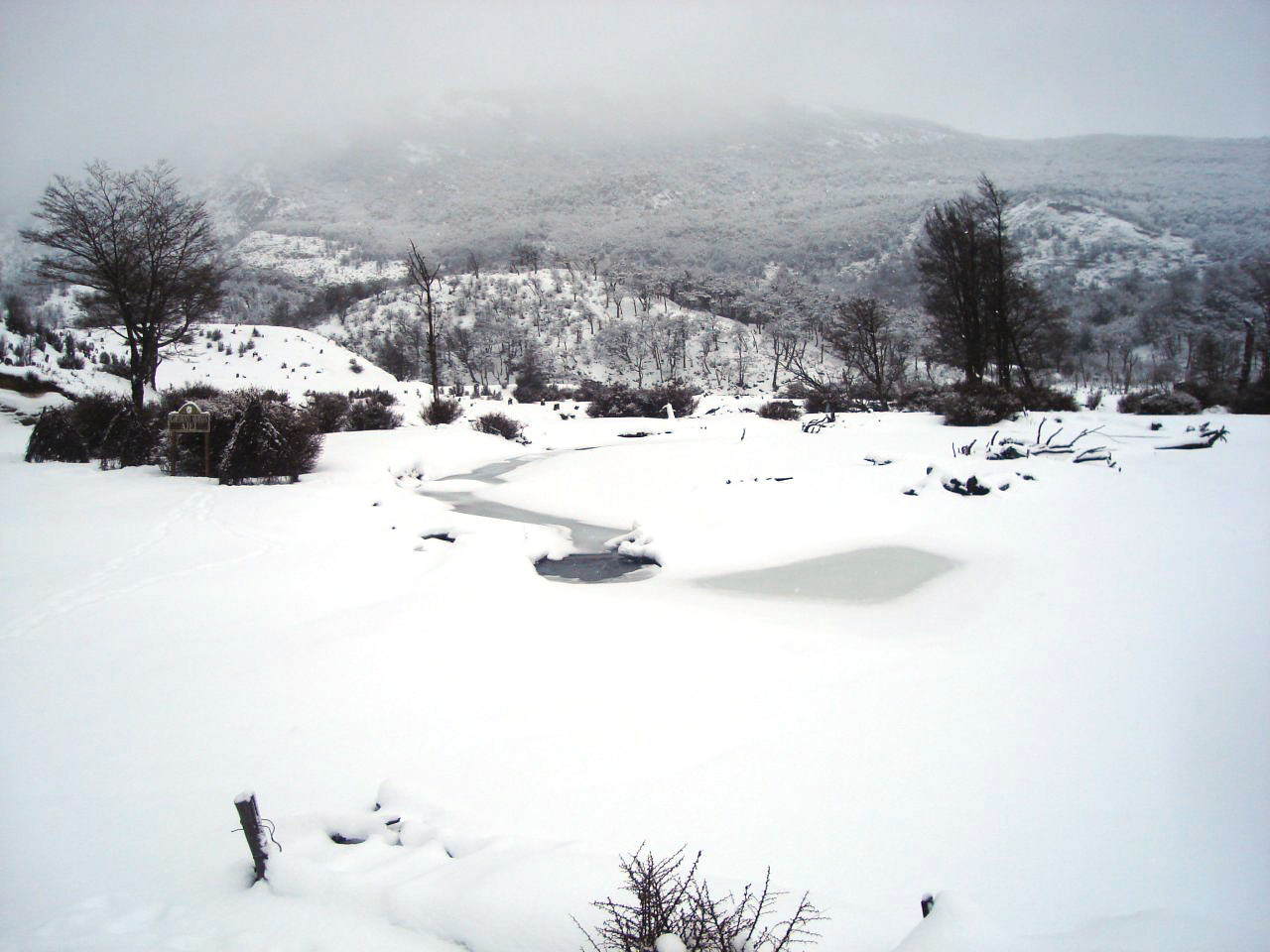
Tierra del Fuego National Park during winter

In winter (June–August), the northern parts of Argentina are generally warm, the central parts mild, and the southern parts cold with frequent frost and snow. The climate of the southern parts of the country is moderated by the surrounding oceans, resulting in cold weather that is less intense and prolonged than at comparable latitudes in the northern hemisphere. The northern parts of the country have the warmest temperatures, with an average of 14 °C (57 °F); the central parts are cooler, with an average of 10 °C (50 °F). In the extreme south, mean temperatures are below 4 °C (39 °F). At higher altitudes in the Andes, average winter temperatures are below 0 °C (32 °F). June and July temperatures are normally similar to each other; however, in August temperatures see a rise of about 2 °C (4 °F).

Precipitation varies a lot during the winter months. The highest are in the extreme northern part of the Littoral region and northwestern parts of Patagonia, where mean winter precipitation exceeds 250 mm (10 in). Most of the humid Pampas, averages between 75 and 200 mm (3 and 8 in) while in the north, in areas bordering the Andes, it averages less than 10 mm (0.4 in).

=== Spring ===
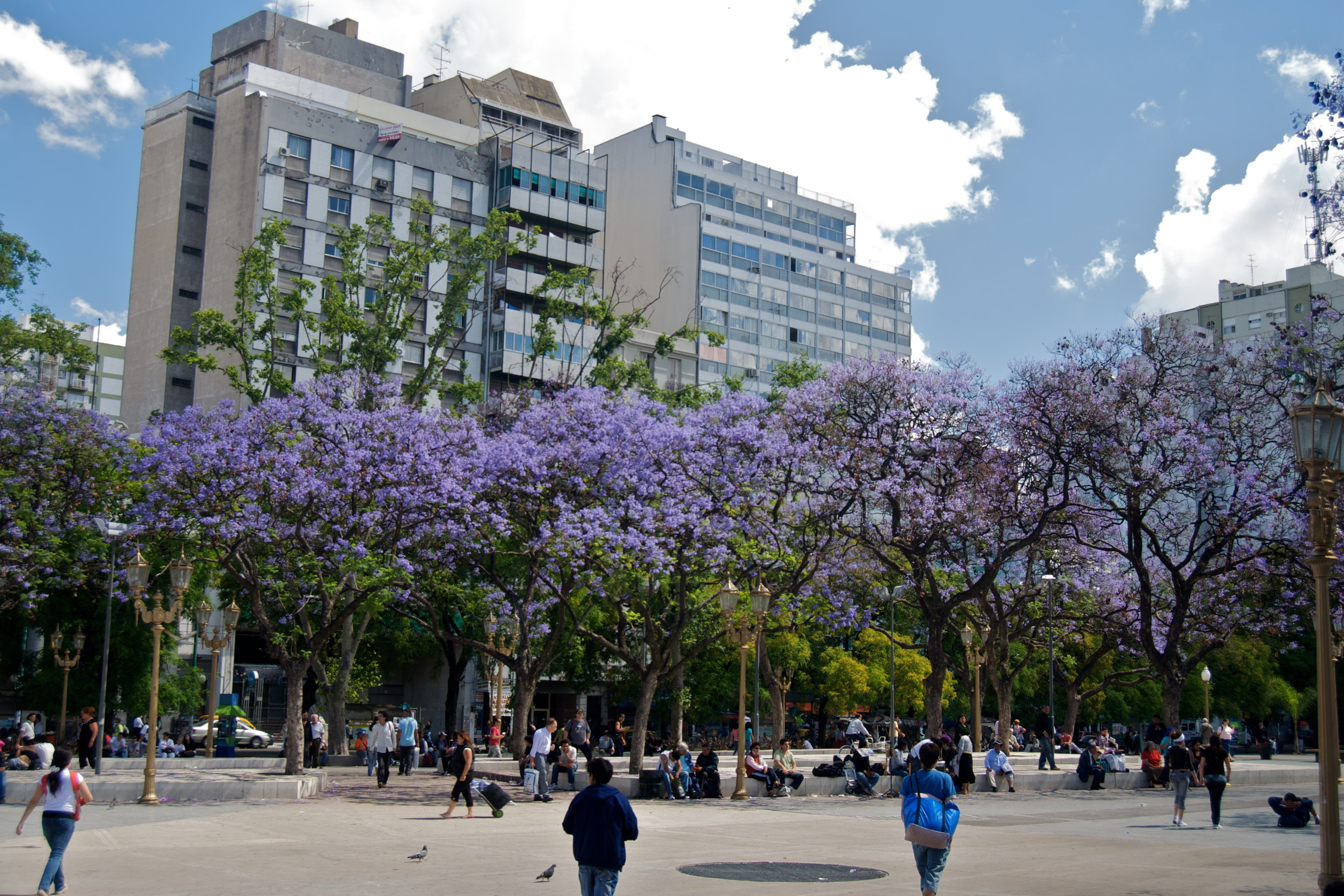
Jacarandas in bloom at Plaza Miserere, Buenos Aires

Spring (September–November) is similar to autumn, with mild days and cool nights. During mid-October a large variety of wild and urban flora are in bloom. Temperatures range from 20 °C (68 °F) in the north to 14 °C (57 °F) in the center, and 8 to 14 °C (46 to 57 °F) in most of Patagonia. Tierra del Fuego Province and the higher altitudes of the Andes have the coolest springs, with mean temperatures below 8 °C (46 °F). Temperatures grow warmer as spring progresses.

During spring, precipitation in the country varies, with the greatest amounts being in northern Buenos Aires Province and the Littoral region, where the average precipitation exceeds 250 mm (10 in). Arid regions (Arid Diagonal) have the lowest spring precipitation, with an average precipitation of less than 50 mm (2 in).

=== Summer ===
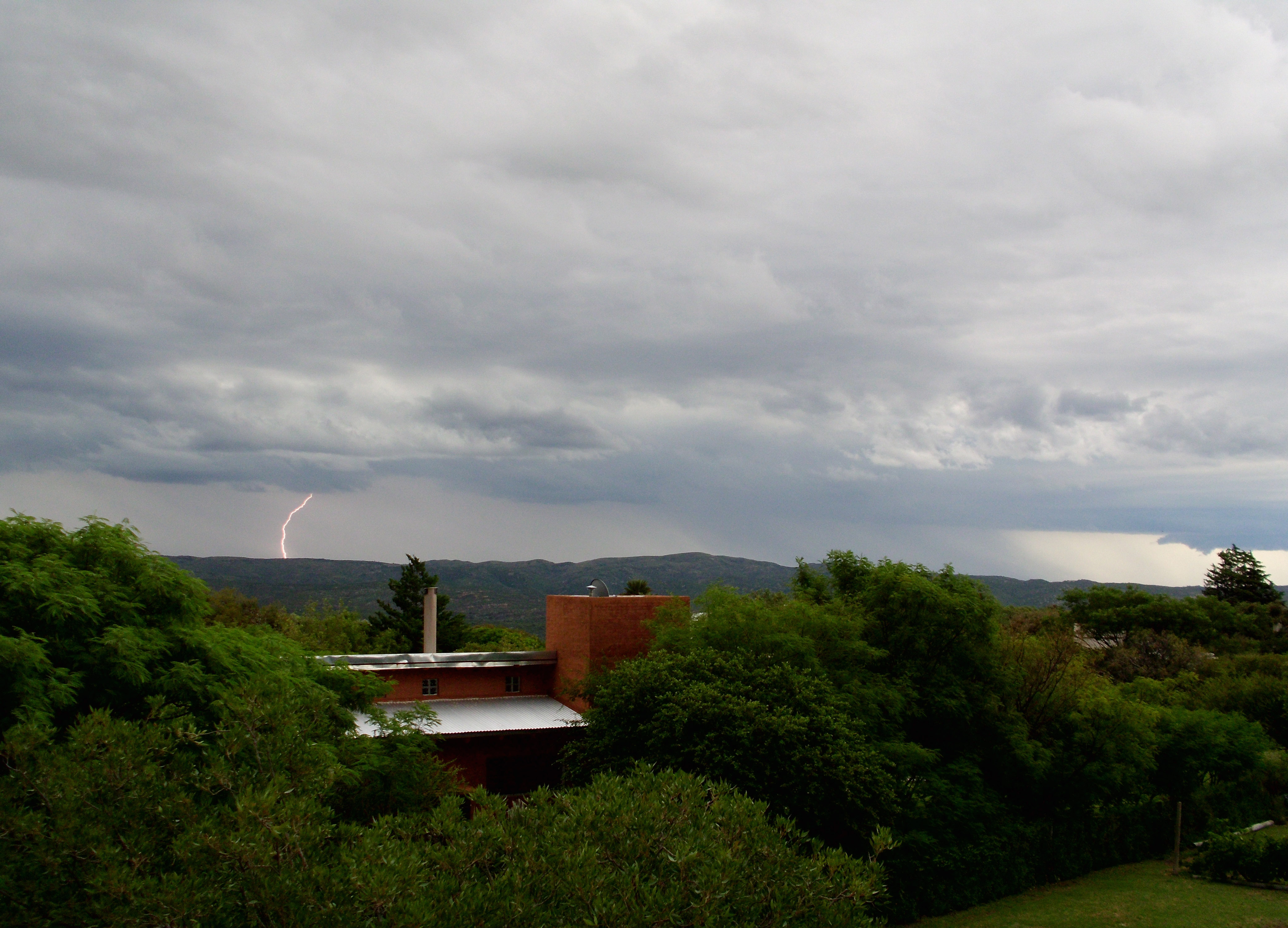
Thunderstorm in Córdoba Province during summer

In summer (December–February), temperatures range from an average of 26 °C (79 °F) in the north to a mean of 20 °C (68 °F) in the center of the country except for the southeastern parts of Buenos Aires Province, where temperatures are cooler in summer due to the maritime influence. In the extreme south of the country, the temperature averages 12 °C (54 °F); at very high altitudes, the average is below 10 °C (50 °F).

During summer, mean precipitation varies throughout the country: the eastern parts of Salta Province, Jujuy Province, northern Tucumán Province and all of Misiones Province are the wettest, receiving more than 400 mm (16 in) of precipitation during the season. Most of the Littoral region and Buenos Aires Province, average between 200 and 300 mm (8 and 12 in). On the other hand, the Patagonia region is dry, with precipitation averaging less than 50 mm (2 in) – and occasionally below 25 mm (0.98 in) – much lower than other regions; Patagonia receives a monthly precipitation of 10 to 25 mm (0.4 to 1.0 in). In the central and northern parts of the country, January is usually the wettest month, with an average monthly precipitation of 100 mm (4 in) in most places, even exceeding 200 mm (8 in) in some places.

=== Autumn ===
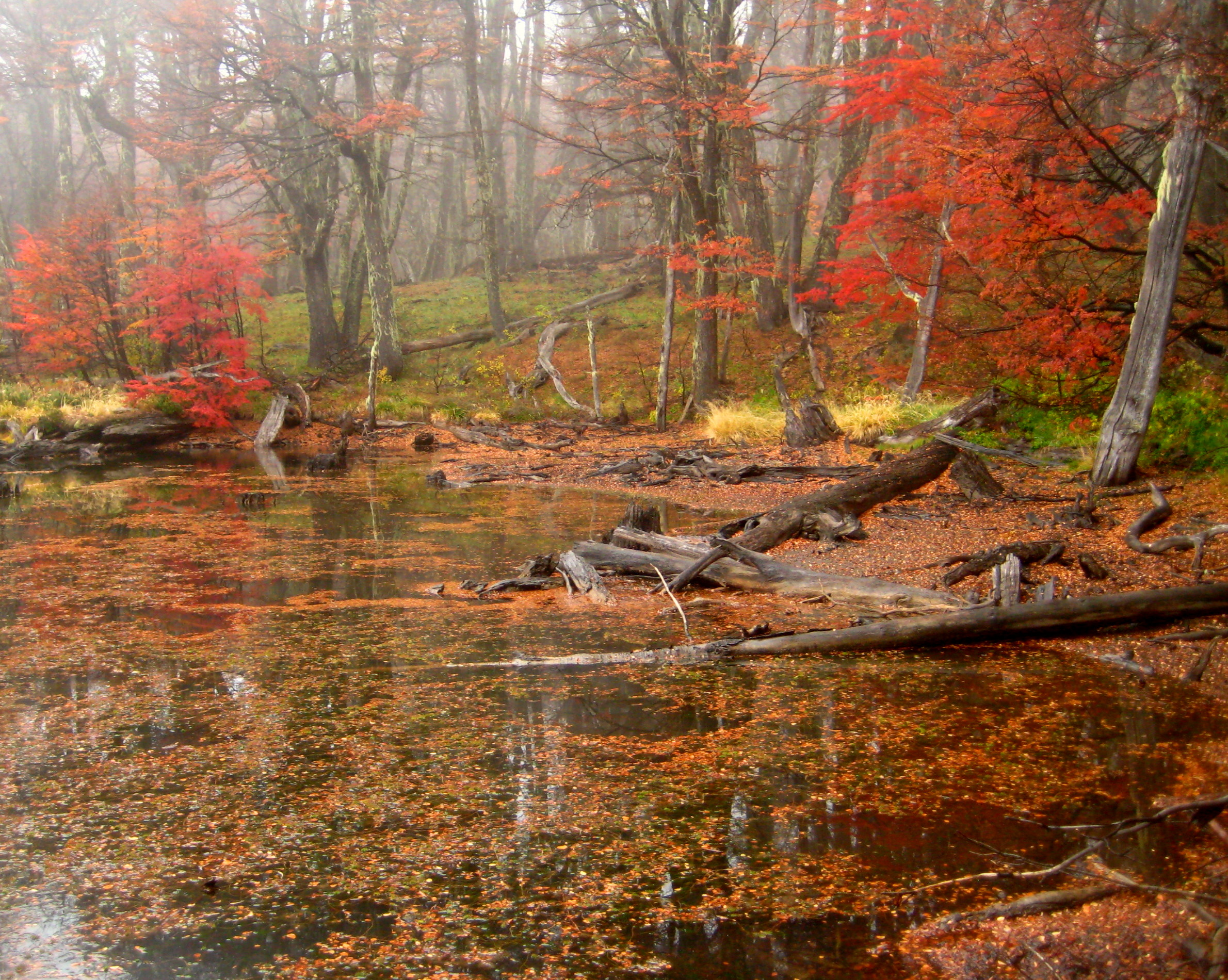
Autumn in Bariloche

Autumn (March–May) is generally mild. Some southern natives forests and vineyards display red and orange autumn foliage, especially in mid-April. Frost arrives notably earlier in the south and later in the north. Mean temperatures can exceed 22 °C (72 °F) in the northern parts of the country, while they can touch 16 °C (61 °F) in most of the central parts of the country, and less than 6 °C (43 °F) at the higher altitudes. As autumn progresses, mean temperatures fall in all regions, with March warmer than May. In the north, mean temperatures range from 24 °C (75 °F) in March to 18 °C (64 °F) in May. In the central parts of the country, mean temperatures in March are between 18 and 22 °C (64 and 72 °F), dropping to 10 and 14 °C (50 and 57 °F) in May. The mean temperature in Tierra del Fuego Province in the extreme south is 10 °C (50 °F), and occasionally lower.

Precipitation is highest in northeast Argentina and lowest in the Patagonia and Cuyo regions. In northeast Argentina, mean precipitation can exceed 400 mm (16 in) while in most of Buenos Aires Province and northwest Argentina, mean autumn precipitation ranges between 200 and 500 mm (8 and 20 in). In most of the western parts of northwest Argentina, Patagonia (except for western Patagonia where precipitation is higher, averaging 100 to 200 mm (4 to 8 in)) and Cuyo regions, precipitation can average less than 50 mm (2 in). In the northwest, precipitation decreases as autumn progresses, ushering in the dry season. For example, in Tucuman Province, March averages more than 200 mm (8 in) of precipitation while May averages less than 50 mm (2 in). In contrast, precipitation increases in Patagonia, particularly in the western parts where May precipitation can exceed 100 mm (4 in).

== Factors that influence the climate ==
Different meteorological factors affect the Argentine climate. Some of these factors are local while others come from other countries.

=== Geographic factors ===
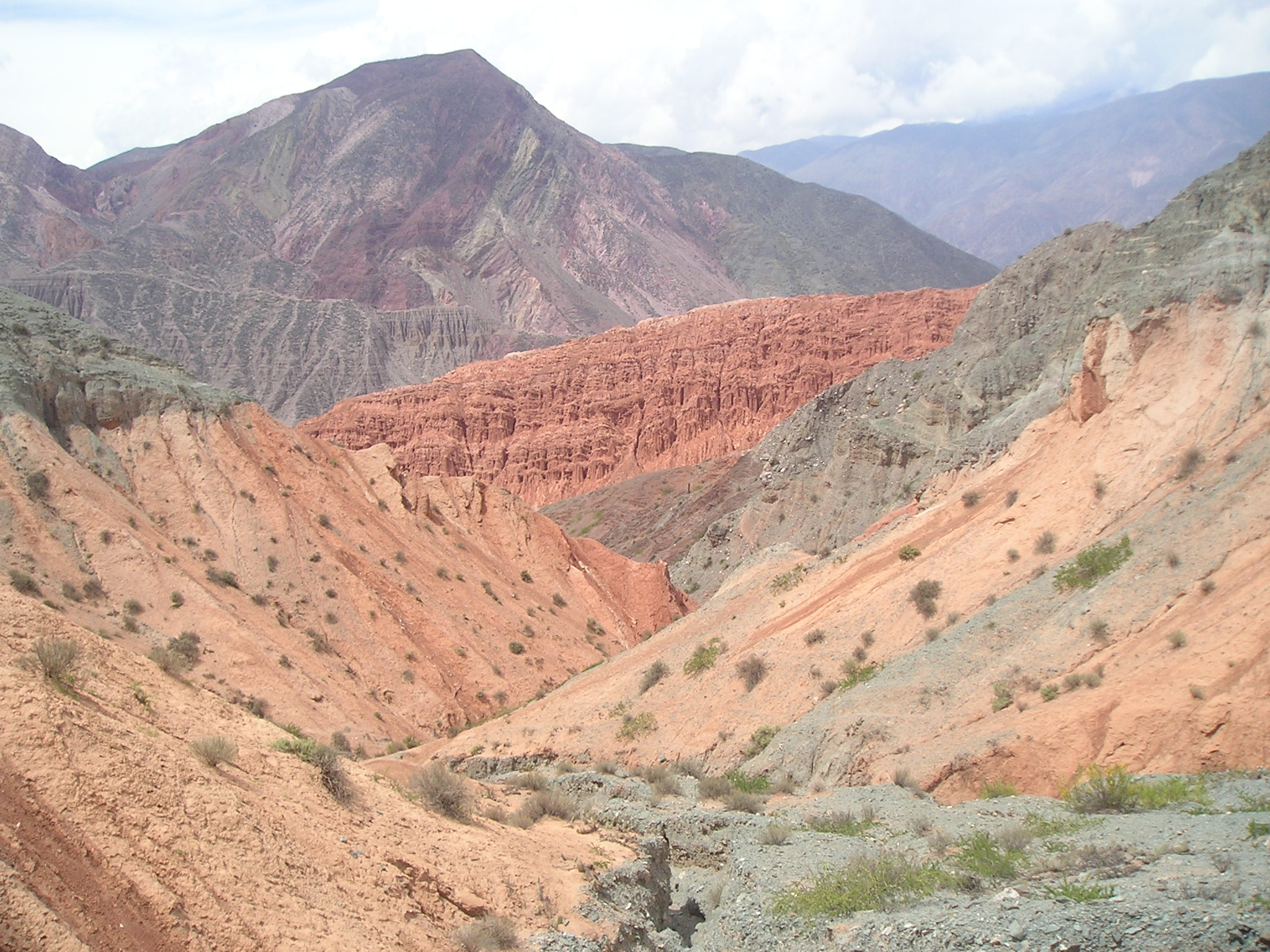
The Andes is an important topographical factor in influencing the climate of Argentina.

The most important geographical factors that influence the climate of Argentina are latitude, elevation, and distance from the sea. With Argentina extending from 22^{o}S to 55^{o}S, there are differences in the amount of incoming solar radiation and the amount of daylight received in each season, which affects temperature. Thus, temperatures decrease from north to south due to the differences in latitudes.

Although the centre and the eastern parts of the country are mostly flat, the west is mountainous. Both the Andes and Sierras Pampeanas affect the climate of Argentina, leading to differences in temperature, pressure, and spatial distribution of precipitation depending on the topography and altitude. Here, the Andes exert an important influence on the climate. Owing to the higher altitudes of the Andes north of 40^{o}S, they completely block the normal westerly flow, preventing low pressure systems containing moisture from the Pacific Ocean from coming in. Thus, much of Argentina north of 40^{o}S is dominated by wind circulation patterns from the South Atlantic High. South of 40^{o}S, the Andes are lower in altitude, allowing much of Patagonia to be dominated by westerly winds and air masses from the Pacific Ocean. However, the north–south orientation of the Andes creates a barrier for humid air masses originating from the Pacific Ocean. This is because they force these air masses upwards, cooling adiabatically. Most of the moisture is dropped on the Chilean side, causing abundant precipitation and cloudiness while on the Argentine side, the air warms adiabatically, causing it to become drier as it descends. Thus, an extensive rain–shadow is present in much of Patagonia, causing it to receive very little precipitation. The Sierras Pampeanas influences the climate on a much smaller scale than the Andes.

Distance from the sea is another important geographic factor. Owing to the shape of the country, the close proximity to the ocean means that most of the country, excluding the north is moderated by the surrounding oceans, leading to lower thermal amplitudes than comparable latitudes in the northern hemisphere. The two main currents that impact the climate of Argentina are the Brazil Current from the north and the Malvinas Current from the south (a branch of the Antarctic Circumpolar Current). The Brazil Current transports warm subtropical waters southwards while the Malvinas Current transports cold, subantarctic waters northwards. The Malvinas Current cools the coastal areas, particularly during winter when the current is stronger. Thus, coastal areas of the Pampas have cooler summers and a longer frost period owing to the cold Malvinas Current. As well, it is the main factor in making Tierra del Fuego colder than at comparable latitudes in the northern hemisphere in Europe since it is influenced by the cold Malvinas Current rather than the warm North Atlantic Current.

=== Atmospheric Circulation ===
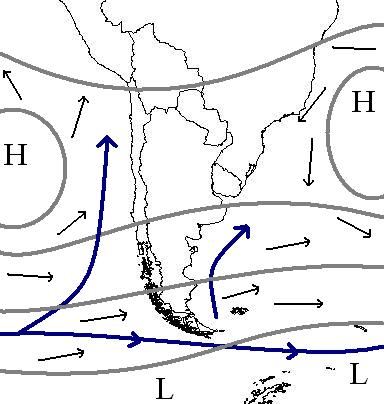
Weather map showing the usual position of weather systems around the southern part of South America.

The South Atlantic High and the South Pacific High both influence the pattern of winds and precipitations in Argentina. Owing to the greater height of the Andes at latitudes north of 40^{o}S, much of Argentina is dominated by wind circulation patterns from the South Atlantic High. The South Atlantic High transports moisture from the Atlantic Ocean to Argentina. This occurs throughout the year due to the atmospheric pressure being lower on land than in the ocean. Much of the north and central parts of the country are affected by the South Atlantic High, with a strong influence in the eastern parts than in the west. This is due to the eastern parts being more frequently affected by the South Atlantic High, causing precipitation to decrease westwards.

Throughout the year, the South Pacific High influences the climate by bringing cold, moist air masses originating from Patagonia. During the most intense cold waves, they form when a transient high pressure system located in the South Pacific Ocean moves eastwards to the southern tip of South America. As it begins to move, this high pressure system strengthens the South Pacific High and is forced to move southwards to south of 40^{o}S where the Andes are shorter in height. As well, an upper-level ridge forms over the South Pacific Ocean along with an upper-level trough extending from subtropical latitudes to the South Atlantic Ocean. At the same time, a low pressure system forms over the South Atlantic Ocean which eventually strengthens. The formation a cold front associated with it moves to the northeast owing to the topographic barrier that the Andes forms. The passage of the cold front to the northeast leads to the movement of the high pressure system from the South Pacific Ocean into the southern tip of South America. All of these conditions lead to strong anticyclogenesis to the east of the Andes and thus, the high pressure system intensifies as it enters southern Argentina. When both the high pressure system (over southern Argentina) and low pressure system strengthen, it creates a very strong pressure gradient that draws cold air from the south, strengthening southerly winds. Owing to the topographic barrier of the Andes, it forces and channels the cold air to accumulate on the eastern side of the Andes. This generates an ageostrophic component from the south (due to a reduction in the Coriolis force caused by accumulation of cold air on the eastern side of the Andes) that draw this cold air northwards, which is driven by this pressure gradient. Cold air can move northwards until 18^{o}S when the blocking effect of the Andes is smaller due to a change in its orientation. Overall, these conditions results in the coldest temperatures due to the cold masses from high latitudes being pulled northwards. A weaker cold wave occurs when the South Pacific High remains over the ocean and does not have a migratory high pressure system originating from the South Pacific High that moves east of the Andes (it builds over the Andes). Although this occurs throughout the year, during winters, it leads to cold temperatures while during summer, it leads to strong and deep convections. These convections are responsible for about 50% of summer precipitation south of 25^{o}S.

The Chaco Low is a semi–permanent low pressure system situated east of the Andes that is approximately located between 20^{o}S and 30^{o}S during summer (displaced to the north in winter). It is stronger in the summer than in winter due to a combination of high insolation, dry surface conditions, and southward displacement of the South Atlantic and South Pacific High (this makes it difficult for cold fronts to enter at lower latitudes). The Chaco Low interacts with the South Atlantic High, generating a pressure gradient that draws moist air from the northeast to coastal and central regions of Argentina. It also forces easterly winds from the Amazon basin to move southward, which is reinforced by the funneling effect from both the Andes and the Brazilian Plateau. The Chaco Low brings large amounts of moisture that favour the development of convective thunderstorms during summer, reaching as far south as 35^{o}S. This movement of air from the north owing to the interaction between the Chaco Low and the South Atlantic high is the strongest in summer when the Chaco Low is at its strongest. These winds bring hot, humid tropical air from the north. Sustained and intense winds from the north are responsible for severe weather events such as heat waves and severe convection. During winter, the Chaco Low weakens as a result of lower insolation. This is partly responsible for the decrease in winter precipitation over much of Argentina (in addition to northward displacement of westerlies) due to a weaker transport of air masses from the tropics. This excludes areas south of 40^{o}S where it is dominated by westerlies.

=== El Niño and La Niña ===
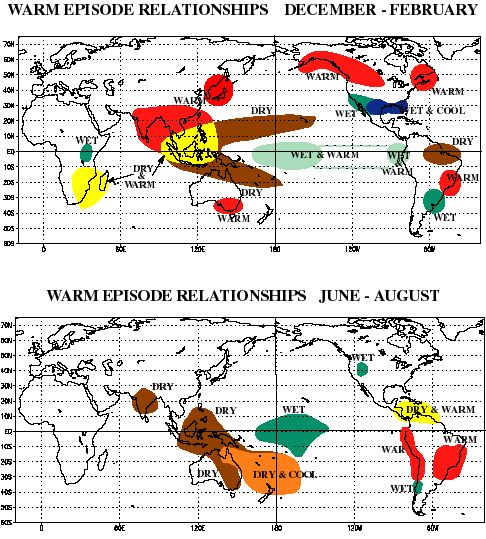
Impacts of El Niño by region.

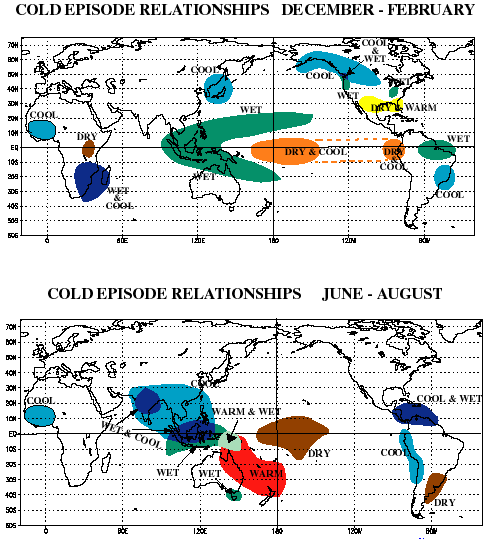
Impacts of La Niña by region.

The El Niño–Southern Oscillation leads to changes in the atmospheric circulation patterns (also known as teleconnections). Although the exact mechanisms are unknown, the impacts of the changes in atmospheric circulation patterns caused by the El Niño–Southern Oscillation are more clearly observed in the more humid eastern parts of the country (between Uruguay and southern Brazil). During El Niño events, precipitation is more higher than normal while during La Niña events, precipitation is lower than normal in the Pampas. In general, El Niño tends to increase precipitation during late spring and summer, particularly in the north. The impacts of La Niña in the eastern parts of the country (northeast and the Pampas) are observed in winter where precipitation is lower. In Northwest Argentina, El Niño events are associated with a strong reduction in rainfall during summer. In contrast, La Niña events increase precipitation in northwest Argentina. In the central–western parts of Patagonia, spring precipitation tends to be lower during La Niña events and higher during El Niño events. Summer precipitation exhibits an opposite pattern where La Niña years involve wetter summers while El Niño years featuring drier summers. On the Andes in central western Argentina, precipitation is higher during El Niño year.

In general, La Niña events are associated with lower temperatures (particularly colder winters) in the Pampas. During winter, frosts are more common during La Niña events compared to El Niño events. This is due to a stronger southerly flow during La Niña events caused by a higher concentration of high pressure systems in the South Pacific and an increase in cyclonic activity (more low pressure systems) in the South Atlantic. This creates conditions that are favourable for bringing cold air from the south, particularly when there is a formation of a high pressure system over Patagonia (associated with the passage of a front) that is responsible for bringing cold air from the south. Thus, invasions of cold air from the south are more common during La Niña events. In contrast, warm spells in the Pampas and northern parts of the country are more intense and frequent during El Niño events. This is due to stronger westerly winds south of 40^{o}S, leading to less frequent incursions of cold air from the south while enhancing winds from the north that bring in warm air. Although La Niña events lead to colder winters with more frequent incursions of cold air in both the north and central parts of the country, it leads to more frequent and intense warm spells in the last months of the year. In other regions, El Niño events lead to more frequent and intense warm spells in Northwest Argentina (during autumn), northeast Argentina (during spring) and central Argentina (during summer). Cold air anomalies arising from El Niño events are observed during spring and are the result of an increase in rainfall that lead to reductions in insolation. For the southern parts of the country, El Niño events are associated with more intense and frequent cold spells during the coldest months. In summer, El Niño events are associated with warmer summer temperatures in the southern parts of the country.

=== Antarctic Oscillation ===
The Antarctic Oscillation, also known as the Southern Hemisphere Annular Mode, is the main factor in tropospheric circulation variability south of 20^{o}S and is characterized by pressure anomalies with one situated in the Antarctic and one situated in a band at around 40–50^{o}S around the globe. It mainly affects middle and high latitudes in the Southern Hemisphere. It is characterized by the north–south displacement of the westerly wind belt that circle around Antarctica. Such variation in the position of the westerly wind belt affects the intensity and position of cold fronts and mid latitude storm systems and is partly responsible for variation in precipitation in the southern parts of Argentina. The Antarctic Oscillation is characterized by two phases: a positive and a negative phase. A positive phase is when the westerly wind belt is displaced to the south. The positive phase occurs when there is increased surface pressure over the southern parts of the South American continent and decreased pressure in Antarctica. This results in stronger westerly winds in the southern parts of the country while preventing cold fronts from penetrating inland, producing more stable conditions. Furthermore, the positive phase leads to warmer conditions south of 40^{o}S, particularly during the summer in areas between 40 and 60^{o}S. Precipitation is lower due to less frontal and orographic precipitation resulting from reduced westerly wind flow between 40 and 60^{O}S. Opposite conditions occur in the negative phase when the westerly wind belt is shifted equatorward. Cold fronts moving northwards from the south penetrate more frequently, leading to more precipitation and cooler temperatures during the negative phase. The major effect of negative phase of the Antarctic Oscillation occurs in spring when it increases precipitation over southeastern South America.

=== Indian Ocean Dipole ===
The Indian Ocean Dipole is an atmospheric–oceanic phenomenon characterized by differences in sea surface temperatures between the eastern and western sections of the tropical Indian Ocean. Similar to the Antarctic Oscillation, the Indian Ocean Dipole is characterized by two phases: a positive and a negative phase. In the positive phase, the eastern section of the tropical Indian Ocean is cooler (lower sea surface temperature) and the western section is warmer than normal (higher sea surface temperature). On the other hand, the negative phase is characterized by warmer sea surface temperatures on the eastern section and cooler sea surface temperatures on the western section of the tropical Indian Ocean. Studies have shown that the Indian Ocean Dipole is partly responsible for variations in precipitation in Argentina and South America in general. During a positive phase, precipitation is higher in the Río de la Plata Basin due to teleconnections.

== Regional climate ==
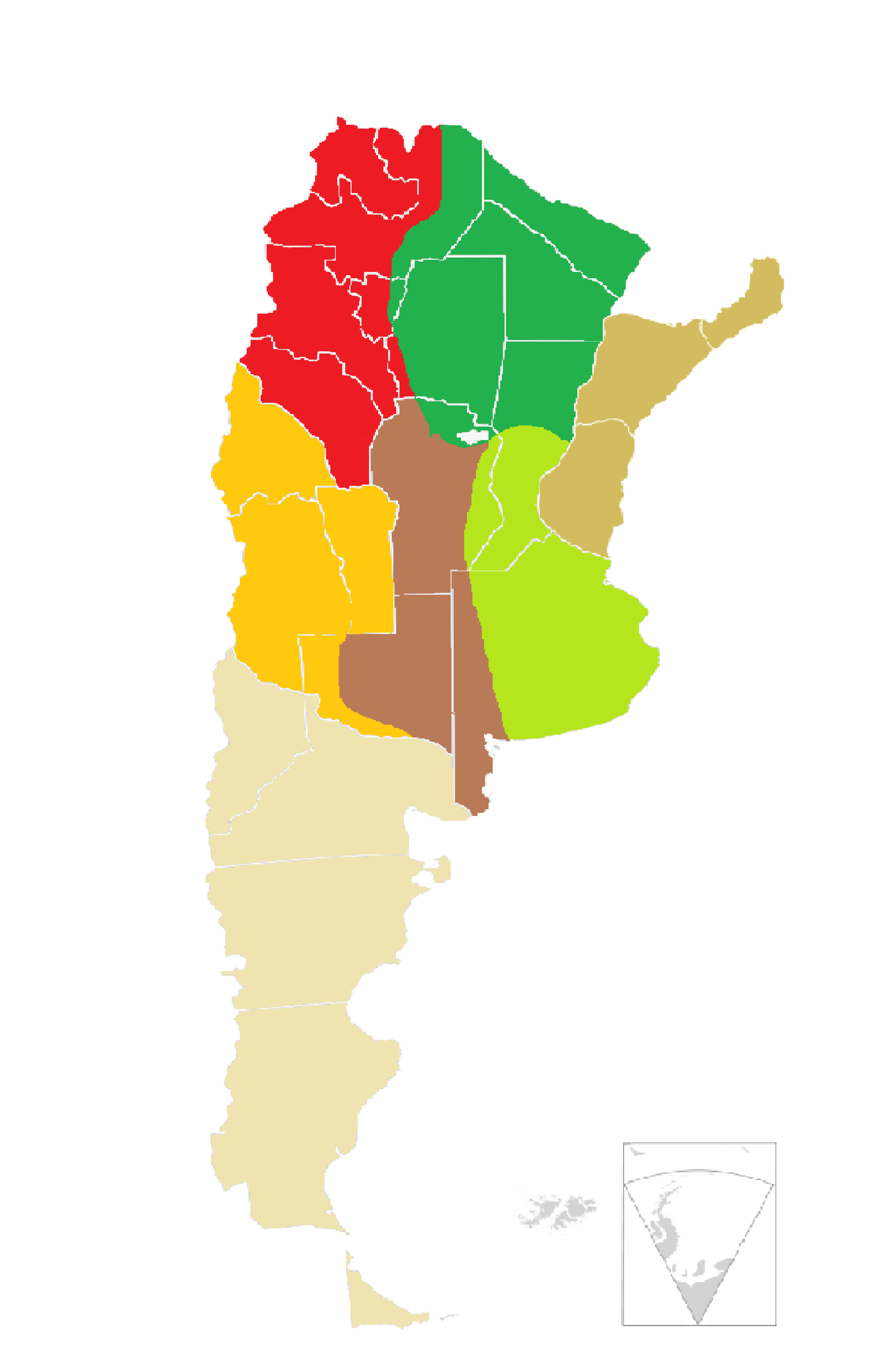
Climatic regions of Argentina: Northwest Chaco Region Mesopotamia Cuyo Humid Pampas Dry Pampas Patagonia Antarctica and South Atlantic islands

In general, Argentina has four main climate types: warm, moderate, arid, and cold, all determined by the expanse across latitude, range in altitude, and relief features. The arid and cold climates predominate in the west and south while the warm and moderate climates predominate in the center and north. The Arid Diagonal traverses the country from the northwest to the southeast. The vast size, and wide range of altitudes, contribute to Argentina's diverse climate. Argentina possesses a wide variety of climatic regions ranging from subtropical in the north to subantarctic in the far south. Lying between those is the Pampas region, which features a mild and humid climate. Under the Köppen climate classification, Argentina has 11 different climate types: Humid Subtropical (Cfa, Cwa), moderate oceanic (Cfb), warm semi-arid (BSh), subtropical highland oceanic (Cwb), warm desert (BWh), cold semi–arid (BSk), cold desert (BWk), moderate Mediterranean (Csb), cold oceanic (Cfc), and tundra (ET). Consequently, there is a wide variety of biomes in the country, including subtropical rain forests, semi-arid and arid regions, temperate plains in the Pampas, and cold subantarctic in the south. However, despite the diversity of biomes, about two-thirds of Argentina is arid or semi-arid. Argentina is best divided into six distinct regions reflecting the climatic conditions of the country as a whole. From north to south, these regions are Northwest, Chaco, Northeast, Cuyo/Monte, Pampas, and Patagonia. Each climatic region has distinctive types of vegetation.

Temperatures are the highest in the northern parts, averaging around 30 °C (86 °F) during summer. Precipitation ranges from 700 mm (28 in) in driest and western parts of the Chaco to around 2,000 mm (79 in) in the extreme east. The center and east of Argentina have a temperate climate with annual precipitation between 800 and 1,200 mm (31 and 47 in) and mean annual temperatures between 15 and 20 °C (59 and 68 °F). The climate in the center of the country becomes more arid towards the west. In the south (Patagonia), most precipitation falls in the Bosque Andino Patagónico located in the Andes while in the east on the Patagonian Steppe, the climate is arid with mean annual precipitation around 200 mm (8 in). Temperatures in Patagonia exceed 0 °C (32 °F) during winter months and owing to the maritime influences of the surrounding Pacific and Atlantic oceans, the thermal amplitude is smaller than at similar latitudes in the Northern Hemisphere.

=== Mesopotamia ===
The region of Mesopotamia includes the provinces of Misiones, Entre Ríos and Corrientes. It has a subtropical climate with no dry season. Under the Köppen climate classification, it has a humid subtropical climate (Cfa). The main features of the climate are high temperatures and abundant rainfall throughout the year; this abundant rainfall makes water scarcity and extended periods of drought uncommon; most of the region has a positive water balance.

Average annual precipitation ranges from less than 1,000 mm (39 in) in the southern parts of the Province to approximately 1,800 mm (71 in) in the eastern parts. Precipitation is slightly higher in the summer than in the winter and generally decreases from east to west and from north to south. Summer precipitation levels range from a low of 300 mm (12 in) to a high of 450 mm (18 in). In this season, most rain falls during convective thunderstorms. Autumn is one of the rainiest seasons, with many places receiving over 350 mm (14 in). As in summer, precipitation falls mainly during convective thunderstorms. Winter is the driest season, with precipitation ranging from less than 40 mm (2 in) in the west to over 340 mm (13 in) in the east. Most of the precipitation during winter comes from frontal systems, particularly the sudestada (Spanish for strong southeasterly winds), bringing long periods of rain, cloudiness, cooler temperatures, and strong winds. Spring is similar to autumn, with a mean precipitation of 340 mm (13 in).

Summers are very hot while winters are mild to warm. The northern parts of the region are warmer than the southern parts. During heat waves, temperatures can exceed 40 °C (104 °F) in the summer months, while in the winter months, cold air masses from the south can push temperatures below freezing, resulting in frost. However, such cold fronts are brief and are less intense than areas further south or at higher altitudes. Snowfall is extremely rare and mainly confined to the uplands of Misiones Province, where the last significant snowfall occurred in 1975 in Bernardo de Irigoyen.

=== Chaco ===
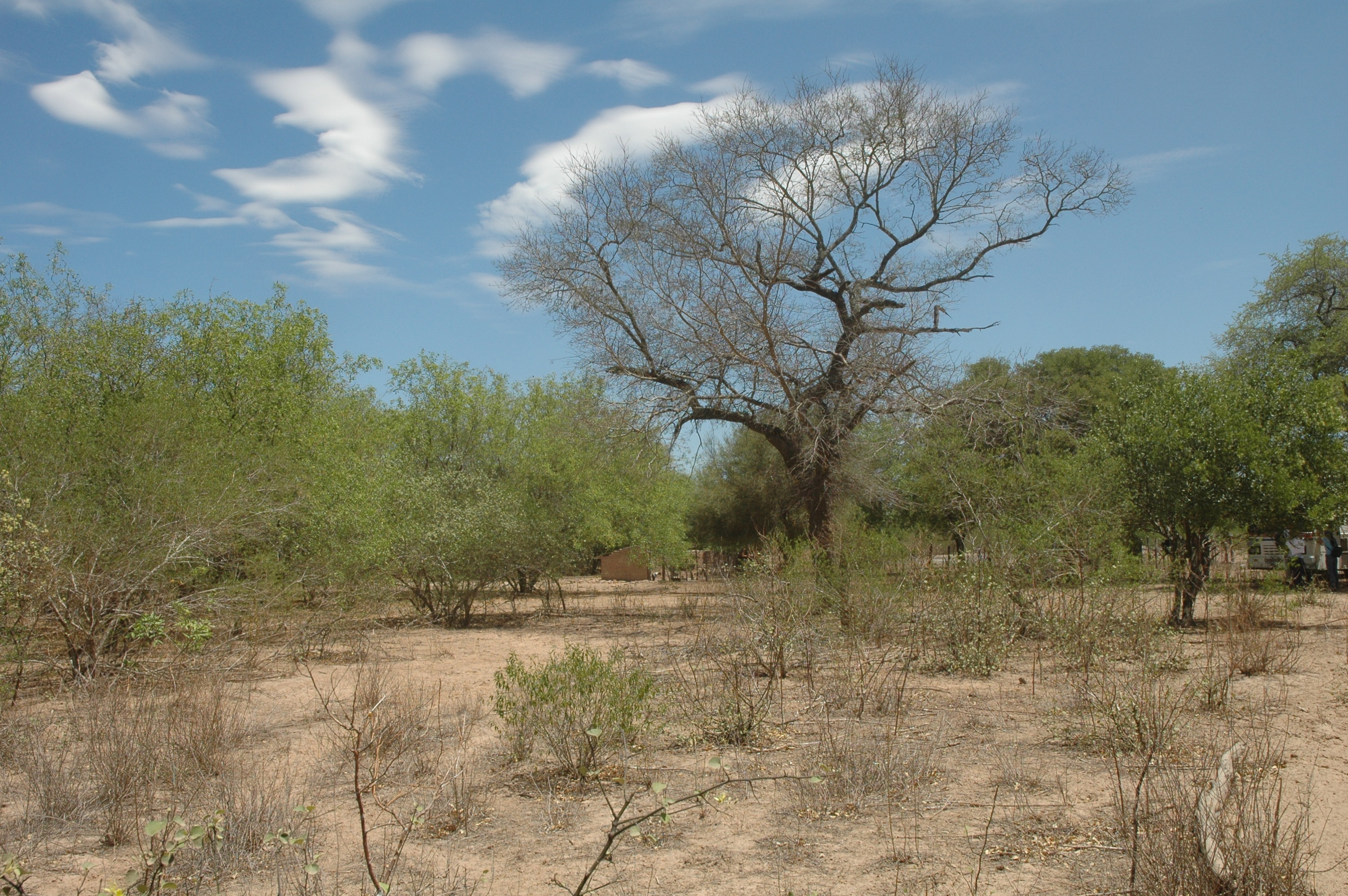
Western parts of Chaco are characterized by shrubs and low to medium forest cover due to lower precipitation.

The Chaco region in the center-north completely includes the provinces of Chaco, and Formosa. Eastern parts of Jujuy Province, Salta Province, and Tucumán Province, and northern parts of Córdoba Province and Santa Fe Province are part of the region. As well, most of Santiago del Estero Province lies within the region. This region, located in the center-north has a subtropical climate with hot, humid summers and mild, dry winters. Under the Köppen climate classification, the west has a semi-arid climate (Bs) while the east has a humid subtropical climate (Cfa). Chaco is one of the few natural regions in the world located between tropical and temperate latitudes that is not a desert. Precipitation and temperature are relatively homogeneous throughout the region.

Mean annual precipitation ranges from 1,200 mm (47 in) in the eastern parts of Formosa Province to a low of 450 to 500 mm (18 to 20 in) in the west and southwest. Summer witnesses the maximum precipitation. Summer rains are intense, and torrential rain is common, occasionally causing floods and soil erosion. During the winter months, precipitation is sparse. Eastern areas receive more precipitation than western areas since they are more influenced by moist air from the Atlantic Ocean, which penetrates the eastern areas more than the west, bringing in more precipitation. As a result, the vegetation differs: eastern areas are covered by forests, savannas, marshes and subtropical wet forest, and western areas are dominated by medium and low forests of mesophytic and xerophytic trees and a dense understory of shrubs and grasses. In all parts of the region, precipitation is highly variable from year to year.

The Chaco region is the hottest in Argentina, with a mean annual temperature of 23 °C (73 °F). With mean summer temperatures occasionally reaching 28 °C (82 °F), the region has the hottest summers in the country. Winters are mild and brief, with mean temperatures in July ranging from 16 °C (61 °F) in the northern parts to 14 °C (57 °F) in the southernmost parts. Temperatures can reach as high has 49 °C (120 °F) in summer, and during cold waves can fall to −6 °C (21 °F).

=== Northwest ===
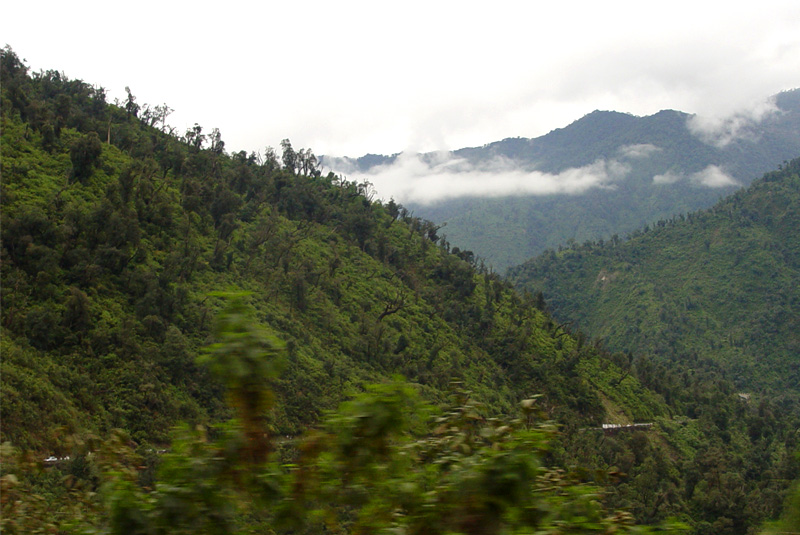
Owing to orographic precipitation, the high rainfall creates a thick jungle on the eastern slopes in the Andes.

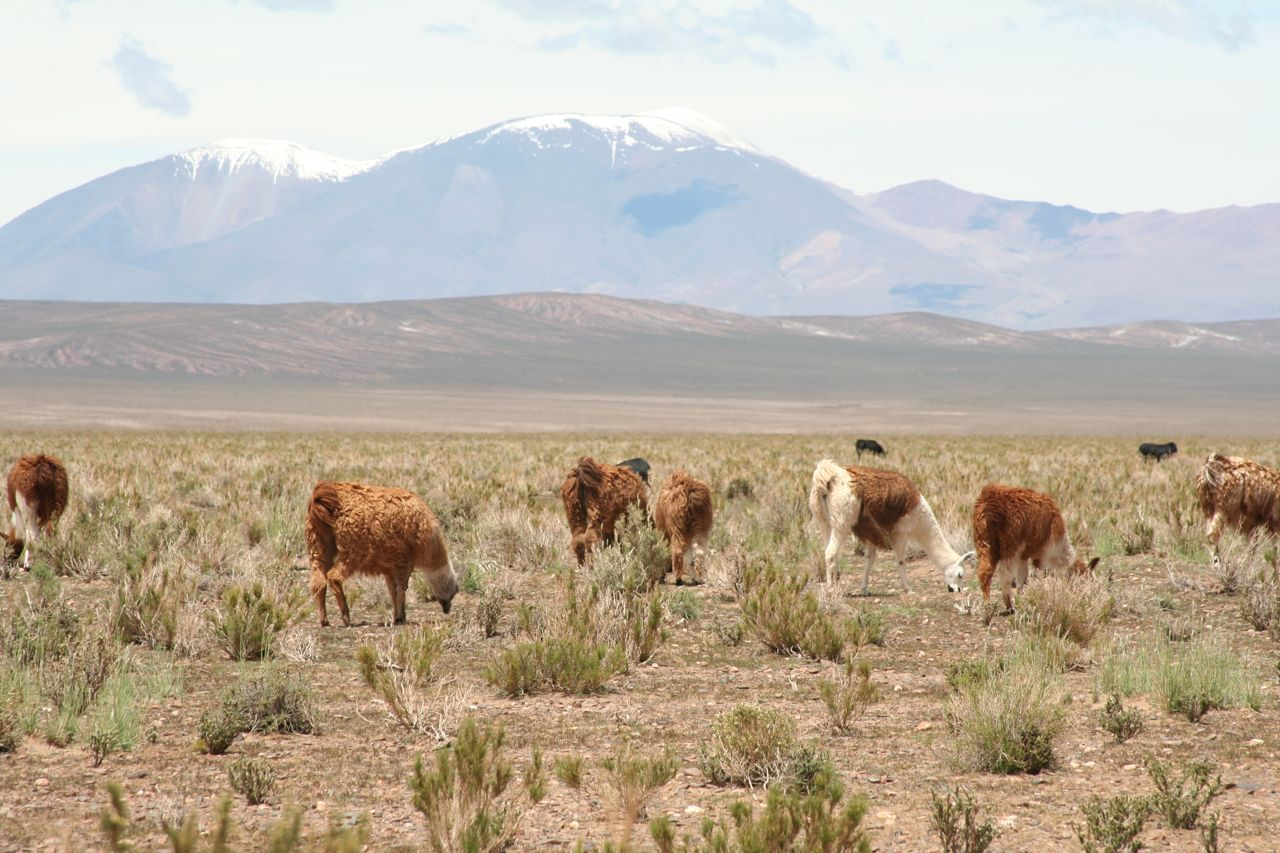
The Altiplano is characterized by a cold, arid but sunny climate with large diurnal ranges.

Northwest Argentina consists of the provinces of Catamarca, Jujuy, La Rioja, and western parts of Salta Province, and Tucumán Province. Although Santiago del Estero Province is part of northwest Argentina, much of the province lies in the Chaco region. Northwest Argentina is predominantly dry, hot, and subtropical. Owing to its rugged and varied topography, the region is climatically diverse, depending on the altitude, temperature and distribution of precipitation. Consequently, the vegetation will also differ. Under the Köppen climate classification, the region has five different climate types: semi–arid (BS), arid (BW), temperate without a dry season and temperate with a dry season (Cf and CW respectively), and, at the highest altitudes, an alpine.

Precipitation is highly seasonal and mostly concentrated in the summer months. It is distributed irregularly due to the country's topography although it generally decreases from east to west. The eastern slopes of the mountains receives between 1,000 and 1,500 mm (39 and 59 in) of precipitation a year, though some places receive up to 2,500 mm (98 in) annually owing to orographic precipitation. The high rainfall on these first slopes creates a thick jungle that extends in a narrow strip along these ranges. The temperate valleys, the location of major cities such as Salta and Jujuy, (Note: According to INTA, the temperate valleys include the Lerma Valley, Siancas Valley in Salta Province and the Pericos Valley and the temperate valleys of Jujuy, which includes the two provincial capitals) have an average precipitation ranging between 500 and 1,000 mm (20 and 39 in), with rainfall mainly concentrated in the summer months, often falling in short but heavy bursts. Valleys in the southern parts of the region are drier than those in the north due to the greater height of the Andes and the Sierras Pampeanas on the eastern slopes than the northern mountains, presenting a significant orographic barrier that blocks moist winds from the Atlantic and Pacific oceans. These valleys receive less than 200 mm (8 in) of precipitation per year and are characterized by sparse vegetation adapted to the arid climate. The area further west in the Puna region, with an average altitude of 3,900 m (12,800 ft), is mostly a desert due to the blocking of the easterly winds by the Andes and the northwest extension of the Sierras Pampeanas. Precipitation in the Puna region averages less than 200 mm (8 in) a year while high isolation, strong winds, and low humidity exacerbate the dry conditions.

Temperatures in northwest Argentina vary by altitude. The temperate valleys have a temperate climate, with mild summers and dry and cool winters with regular frosts.In the Quebrada de Humahuaca valley, mean annual temperatures range from 12.0 to 14.1 °C (53.6 to 57.4 °F), depending on altitude. In the Calchaquí Valleys in Salta Province, the climate is temperate and arid with large thermal amplitudes, long summers, and a long frost-free period. In the valleys in the south in La Rioja Province, Catamarca Province and the southwest parts of Santiago del Estero Province, which is part of the arid Chaco ecoregion, temperatures during the summer are very high, averaging 26 °C (79 °F) in January while winters are mild, averaging 12 °C (54 °F). Cold fronts from the south bringing cold Antarctic air can cause severe frosts in the valleys of La Rioja Province and Catamarca Province. In contrast, the Zonda wind, which occurs more often during the winter months, can raise temperatures up to 35 °C (95 °F) with strong gusts, sometimes causing crop damage. Temperatures in the Puna region are much colder, with a mean annual temperature of less than 10 °C (50 °F) owing to the high altitude. The Puna region is characterized by being cold with a large diurnal range but sunny throughout the year.

=== Cuyo ===
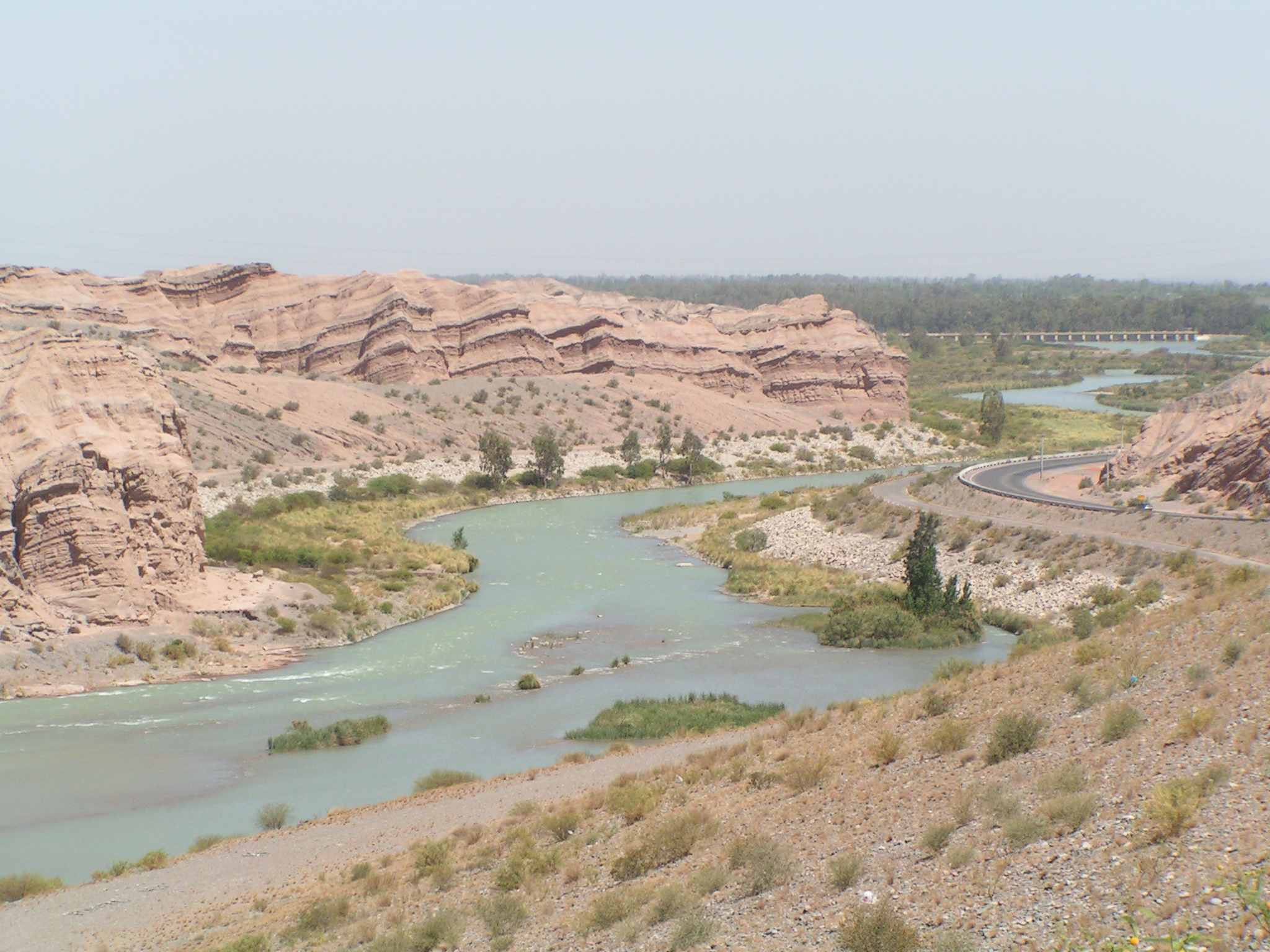
Most of the Cuyo region is dry, depending on rivers for irrigation

The Cuyo region includes the provinces of Mendoza, San Juan, and San Luis. Western parts of La Pampa Province (as shown in map) also belong in this region, having similar climatic and soil characteristics to it. It has an arid or a semi-arid climate. The region's wide range in latitude, combined with altitudes ranging from 500 m (1,600 ft) to nearly 7,000 m (23,000 ft), means that it has a variety of different climate types. In general, most of the region has a temperate climate, with valleys at higher altitudes having a milder climate. At the highest altitudes (over 4,000 m (13,123 ft)), icy conditions persist year round.

Average annual precipitation ranges from 100 to 500 mm (4 to 20 in), though it is generally unpredictable. More than 85% of annual rainfall occurs from October to March, which constitutes the warm season. In contrast, the winter months are dry. Eastern and southeastern areas of the region receive more precipitation than the western areas since they receive more summer rainfall. Precipitation is highly variable from year to year and appears to follow a cycle between dry and wet years in periods of about 2, 4–5, 6–8, and 16–22 years. In wet years, easterly winds caused by the subtropical South Atlantic High are stronger, causing moisture to flow towards this region; during dry years, these winds are weaker.

Summers in the region are hot and generally sunny; winters are dry and cold. Since this region has a wide range of altitudes, ranging from 500 m (1,600 ft) to nearly 7,000 m (23,000 ft), temperatures can vary widely. The Sierras Pampeanas, which cross into both San Juan Province and San Luis Province, have a milder climate with mean annual temperatures ranging from 12 to 18 °C (54 to 64 °F). Throughout the region, the diurnal range is great, with very high temperatures during the day followed by cold nights. In all locations, at altitudes over 3,800 m (12,500 ft), permafrost is present; icy conditions persist year round at altitudes over 4,000 m (13,000 ft).

The Zonda, a Foehn wind characterized by warm, dry air, can cause temperatures to exceed 30 °C (86 °F) and occasionally 45 °C (113 °F), as occurred in 2003. However, cold waves are also common, caused by the channeling by the Andes of cold air from the south, making for frequent cold fronts during the winter months and bringing temperatures that can fall below freezing, and occasionally below −10 to −30 °C (14 to −22 °F) at higher altitudes.

=== Pampas ===
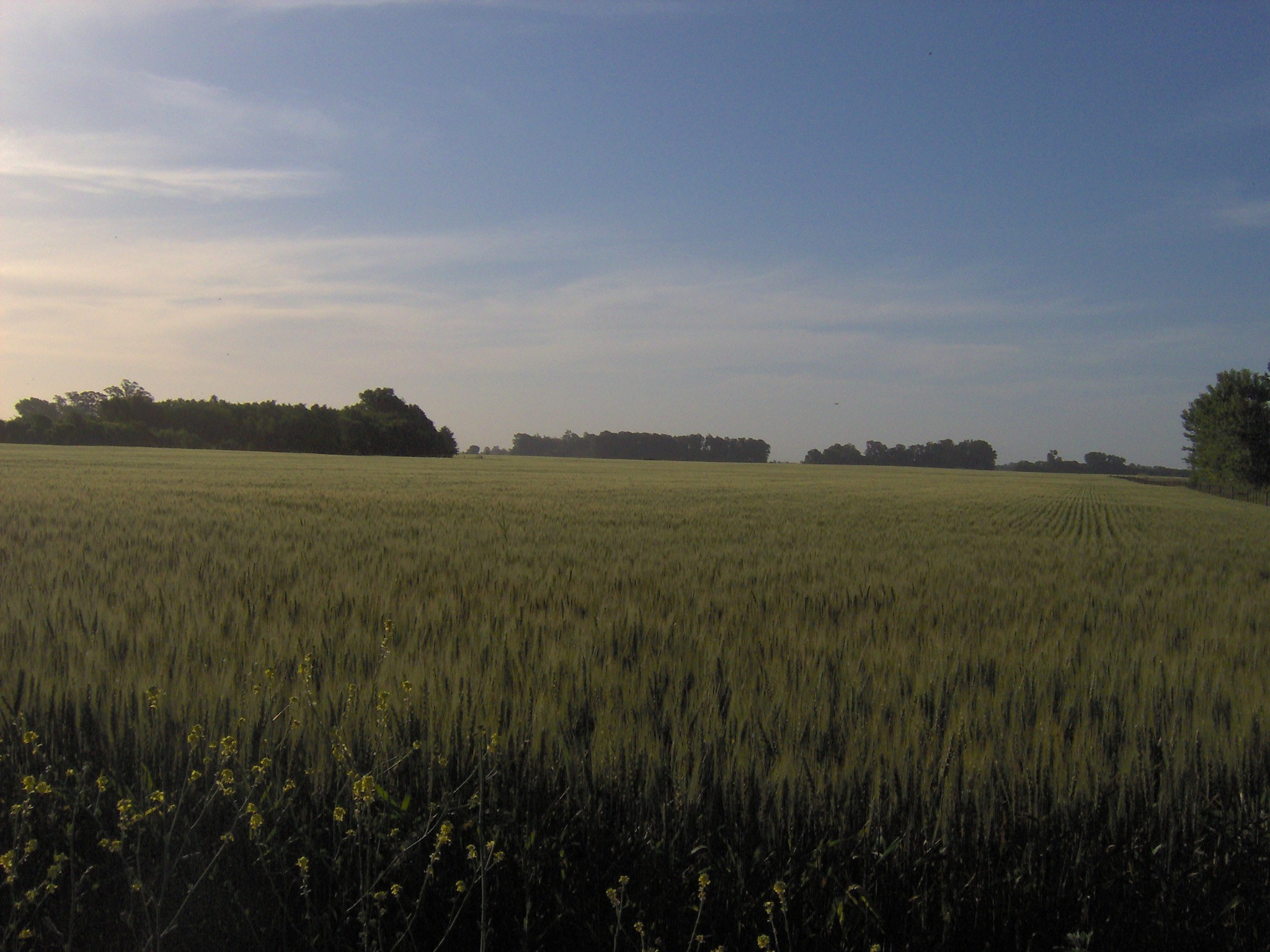
Pampas landscape

The Pampas includes all of Buenos Aires Province, eastern and southern Córdoba Province, eastern La Pampa Province, and southern Santa Fe Province. It is subdivided into two parts: the humid Pampas to the east, and the dry/semi–arid Pampas to the west. The Pampas has land that is appropriate for agriculture and raising livestock. It is a mostly flat area, interrupted only by the Tandil and Ventana sierras in its southern portion. The climate of the Pampas is characterized as temperate and humid with no dry season, featuring hot summers and mild winters (Cfa/Cfb according to the Köppen climate classification). The weather in the Pampas is variable due to the contrasting air masses and frontal storms that impact the region. Annual temperatures range from 17 °C (63 °F) in the north to 14 °C (57 °F) in the south. Precipitation increases toward the east and ranges from under 500 mm (20 in) in the south and west to 1,200 mm (47 in) in the northeast. Precipitation is fairly evenly distributed throughout the year in the easternmost parts of the Pampas; in the western parts, most of the precipitation is concentrated during the summer months, and winters are drier. The Pampas are influenced by the El Niño Southern Oscillation, which is responsible for variation in annual precipitation. An El Niño year leads to higher precipitation while a La Niña year leads to lower precipitation.

Summers in the Pampas are hot and humid with coastal areas being modified by the cold Malvinas Current. Afternoon thunderstorms, which can bring intense amounts of precipitation, are common, as are heat waves that can bring temperatures in the 36 to 40 °C (97 to 104 °F) range for a few days. These thunderstorms are known to have the most frequent lightning and highest convective cloud tops in the world. The severe thunderstorms produce intense hailstorms, floods, including flash floods, as well as the most consistently active tornado region outside the central and southeastern US. These are usually followed a day or two of strong Pampero winds from the south, which bring cool, dry air. Precipitation in the summer is high, with monthly amounts averaging between 90 mm (4 in) and 160 mm (6 in) in most places.

Autumn arrives in March and brings periods of very rainy weather followed by dry, mild stretches and cool nights. Some places in the east receive rainfall throughout autumn whereas in the west, after the rains, the weather quickly becomes very dry. Generally, frost arrives in early April in the southernmost areas, in late May in the north, and ends by mid-September, although the dates of the first and last frosts can vary from year to year. Frost is rarely intense or prolonged and may not occur each year.

Winters are mild with frequent frosts and cold spells. Temperatures are usually mild during the day and cold during the night. Most precipitation results from frontal systems associated with cyclogenesis and sudestada, which bring long periods of precipitation, cloudiness and cooler temperatures, particularly in the southern and eastern parts. Dull, gray and damp weather characterize winters in the Pampas. Occasionally, tropical air masses from the north may move southward, providing relief from the cool, damp temperatures. Snowfall is extremely rare. When it does snow, it usually lasts for only a day or two.

=== Patagonia ===
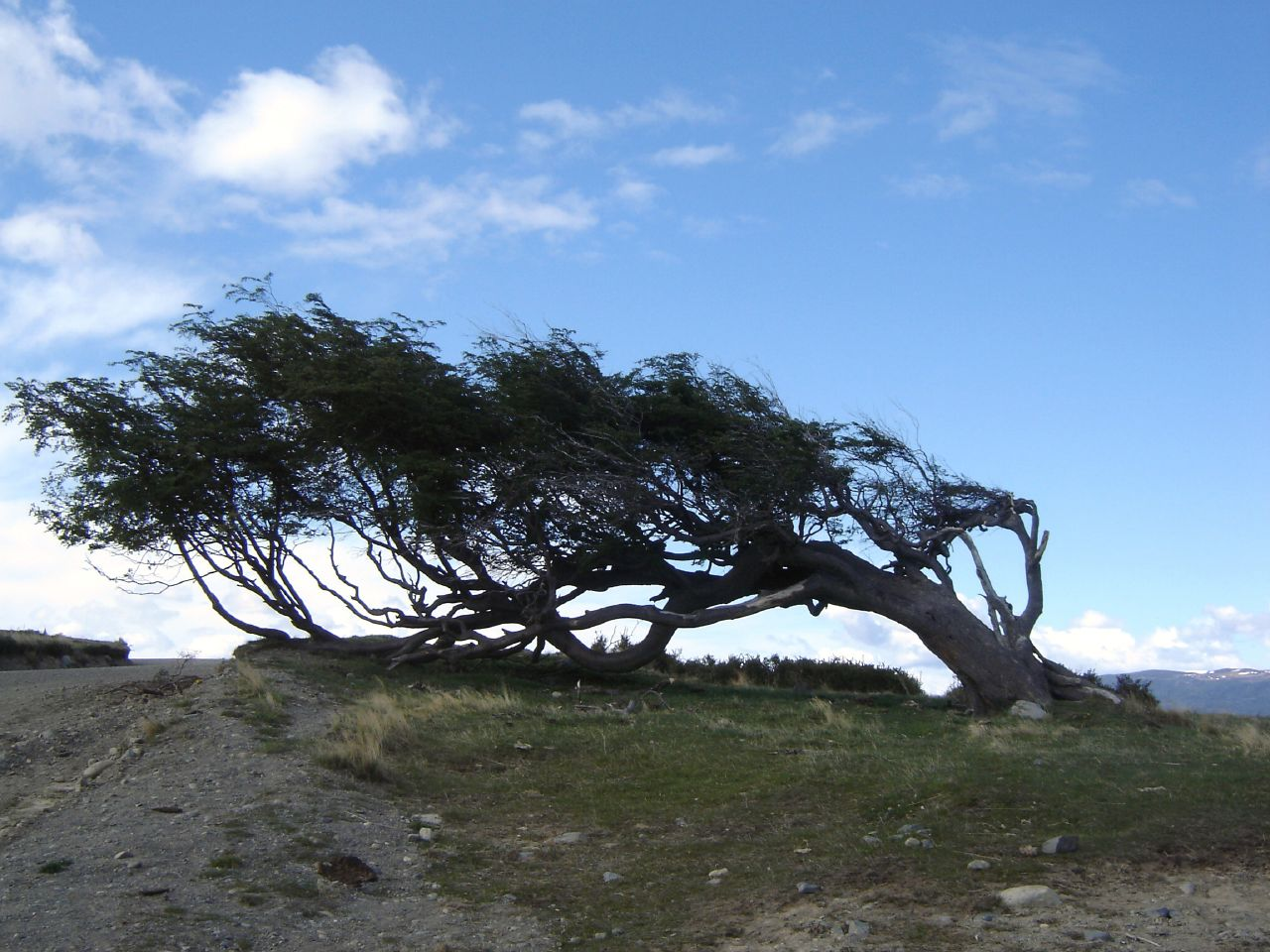
The Patagonian climate is characterized by strong, persistent winds from the west year round, forming characteristic Flag trees.

Chubut, Neuquén, Río Negro, Santa Cruz, and Tierra del Fuego are the provinces that make up Patagonia. The Patagonian climate is classified as arid to semi-arid and temperate to cool temperate. One defining characteristic are the strong winds from the west which blow year round (stronger in summer than in winter), which favors evaporation and is a factor in making the region mostly arid. There are three major factors that influence the climate of the region: the Andes, the South Pacific High and South Atlantic High, and an isolation that is more pronounced in eastern than western areas.

The north–south orientation of the Andes creates a barrier for humid air masses coming from the Pacific Ocean, forming an extensive rain shadow and causing most of the region to be arid. South of 52°S, the Andes are lower in elevation, reducing the rain shadow effect in Tierra del Fuego Province and allowing forests to thrive on the Atlantic coast. Patagonia is located between the subtropical high pressure belt and the subpolar low pressure zone, meaning it is exposed to westerly winds that are strong, since south of 40°S there is little land to block these winds. Because Patagonia is located between the semi-permanent anticyclones of the Pacific Ocean and the Atlantic Ocean at around 30°S, and the Subpolar Low at around 60°S, the movement of the high and low pressure systems along with ocean currents determine the precipitation pattern.

The influence of the Pacific Ocean, general circulation patterns, and the topographic barrier caused by the Andes results in one of the strongest precipitation gradients in the world. Precipitation steeply decreases from west to east, ranging from 4,000 mm (160 in) in the west on the Andean foothills at 41°S to 150 mm (6 in) in the central plateaus. The high precipitation in the Andes in this region allows forests to thrive as well as glaciers and permanent snowfields. Most of the region receives less than 200 mm (8 in) of precipitation per year. The aridity of the region is due to the combination of low precipitation, strong winds, and high temperatures in the summer months, all of which cause high evaporation rates. In most of Patagonia, precipitation is concentrated in the winter months, except for the northeastern and southern parts, where precipitation is more evenly distributed. Thunderstorms are infrequent, occurring only during summer. Snowfall occurs mainly in the west and south, which can result in strong snowstorms.

Patagonia's temperatures are relatively cold for its latitude due to the cold Malvinas Current (also called the Falkland(s) Current) and the high altitude. A characteristic of the temperature pattern is the NW–SE distribution of isotherms due to the presence of the Andes. The warmest parts of the region are in northern parts of Rio Negro Province and Neuquén Province, where mean annual temperatures range from 13 to 15 °C (55 to 59 °F), while the coldest are in western Santa Cruz Province and Tierra del Fuego Province, where mean temperatures range from 5 to 8 °C (41 to 46 °F). At higher altitudes in the Andes stretching from Neuquén Province to Tierra del Fuego Province, mean annual temperatures are below 5 °C (41 °F). Strong westerly winds can decrease the perception of temperature (wind chill), particularly in summer. The annual range of temperatures in Patagonia is lower than at similar latitudes in the northern hemisphere owing to the narrowness of the region at higher latitudes and the stronger maritime influence.

== Statistics ==
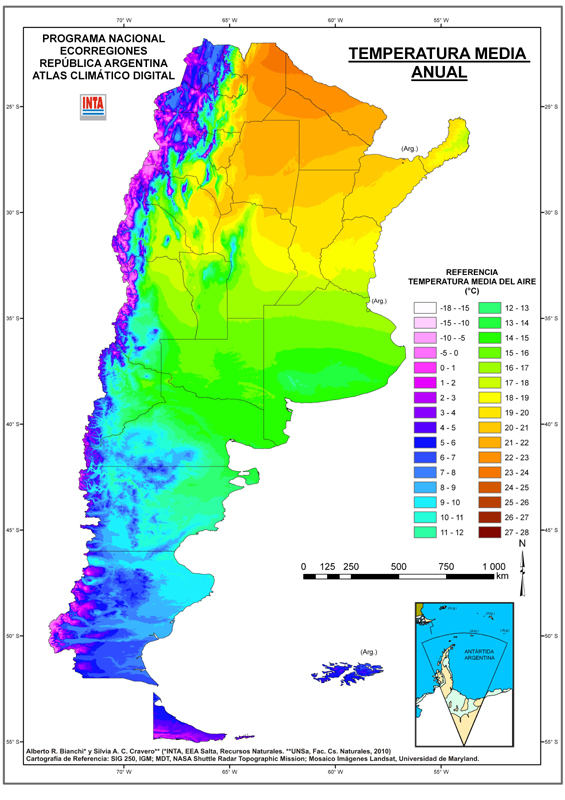
Mean temperatures in Argentina

The average annual precipitation ranges from less than 100 millimetres (4 in) in the Atacama Desert near the border with Chile to over 2,000 millimetres (79 in) in the northeast and along the eastern slopes of the Andes in the northern parts of the country. The Andean foothills of Patagonia in the western parts of the region can receive up to 3,500 millimetres (138 in) per year. Mean annual temperatures range from 5 °C (41 °F) in the far south to 25 °C (77 °F) in the north. Shown below are the mean monthly temperature and precipitation for selected places in Argentina along with the overall averages for the country (based on a 0.5^{o} latitude/longitude grid). Year-round averages and totals are displayed along with conversions to imperial units.

=== Temperature ===
Average Temperatures in various locations in Argentina in °C (°F)
Location	Region	Jan	Feb	Mar	Apr	May	Jun	Jul	Aug	Sept	Oct	Nov	Dec	Annual
Salta	Northwest	21.4 (70.5)	20.3 (68.5)	19.5 (67.1)	16.6 (61.9)	13.1 (55.6)	10.6 (51.1)	10.1 (50.2)	12.7 (54.9)	15.1 (59.2)	19.1 (66.4)	20.5 (68.9)	21.5 (70.7)	16.7 (62.1)
La Quiaca	Northwest	12.8 (55.0)	12.5 (54.5)	12.4 (54.3)	10.9 (51.6)	6.9 (44.4)	4.4 (39.9)	4.1 (39.4)	6.7 (44.1)	9.3 (48.7)	11.7 (53.1)	12.8 (55.0)	13.4 (56.1)	9.8 (49.6)
La Rioja	Northwest	27.2 (81.0)	25.8 (78.4)	23.9 (75.0)	19.7 (67.5)	15.1 (59.2)	11.4 (52.5)	10.8 (51.4)	14.2 (57.6)	17.9 (64.2)	22.9 (73.2)	25.5 (77.9)	27.4 (81.3)	20.2 (68.4)
Santiago del Estero	Chaco Region	26.7 (80.1)	25.5 (77.9)	23.8 (74.8)	19.8 (67.6)	16.1 (61.0)	12.7 (54.9)	12.2 (54.0)	15.3 (59.5)	18.5 (65.3)	22.7 (72.9)	24.8 (76.6)	26.5 (79.7)	20.4 (68.7)
Formosa	Chaco Region	27.6 (81.7)	26.8 (80.2)	25.7 (78.3)	22.5 (72.5)	18.9 (66.0)	17.0 (62.6)	16.3 (61.3)	18.1 (64.6)	19.8 (67.6)	23.0 (73.4)	24.7 (76.5)	26.7 (80.1)	22.3 (72.1)
Posadas	Mesopotamia	27.0 (80.6)	26.2 (79.2)	25.1 (77.2)	21.9 (71.4)	18.3 (64.9)	16.5 (61.7)	16.1 (61.0)	17.9 (64.2)	19.2 (66.6)	22.3 (72.1)	24.2 (75.6))	26.3 (79.3)	21.8 (71.2)
San Juan	Cuyo	27.1 (80.8)	25.5 (77.9)	22.8 (73.0)	17.2 (63.0)	12.2 (54.0)	8.3 (46.9)	7.7 (45.9)	10.6 (51.1)	14.4 (57.9)	19.8 (67.6)	23.4 (74.1)	26.3 (79.3)	17.8 (64.0)
San Luis	Cuyo	24.4 (75.9)	23.2 (73.8)	20.8 (69.4)	16.6 (61.9)	12.9 (55.2)	10.0 (50.0)	9.4 (48.9)	11.9 (53.4)	14.7 (58.5))	18.9 (66.0))	21.6 (70.9)	23.8 (74.8)	17.4 (63.3)
Malargüe	Cuyo	20.0 (68.0)	18.7 (65.7)	16.2 (61.2)	11.3 (52.3)	7.1 (44.8)	4.6 (40.3)	3.6 (38.5)	5.5 (41.9)	8.2 (46.8)	12.6 (54.7)	16.0 (60.8)	19.0 (66.2)	11.9 (53.4)
Puente del Inca	Cuyo	14.2 (57.6)	13.8 (56.8)	11.7 (53.1)	8.4 (47.1)	4.2 (39.6)	0.9 (33.6)	−0.1 (31.8)	1.2 (34.2)	4.0 (39.2)	6.6 (43.9)	10.1 (50.2)	13.1 (55.6)	7.4 (45.3)
Buenos Aires	Humid Pampas	24.9 (76.8)	23.6 (74.5)	21.9 (71.4)	17.9 (64.2)	14.5 (58.1)	11.7 (53.1)	11.0 (51.8)	12.8 (55.0)	14.6 (58.3)	17.8 (64.0)	20.7 (69.3)	23.3 (73.9)	17.9 (64.2)
Córdoba	Dry Pampas	24.3 (75.7)	23.1 (73.6)	21.7 (71.1)	18.0 (64.4)	14.5 (58.1)	11.4 (52.5)	10.8 (51.4)	13.3 (55.9)	15.7 (60.3)	19.5 (67.1)	21.8 (71.2)	23.7 (74.7)	18.2 (64.8)
Santa Rosa	Dry Pampas	23.6 (74.5)	22.1 (71.8)	19.5 (67.1)	14.9 (58.8)	11.0 (51.8)	7.9 (46.2)	7.2 (45.0)	9.5 (49.1)	12.1 (53.8)	15.9 (60.6)	19.4 (66.9)	22.5 (72.5)	15.5 (59.9)
Mar del Plata	Humid Pampas	20.4 (68.7)	19.8 (67.6)	18.2 (64.8)	14.5 (58.1)	11.2 (52.2)	8.4 (47.1)	7.5 (45.5)	8.8 (47.8)	10.4 (50.7)	13.3 (55.9)	15.9 (60.6)	18.5 (65.3)	13.9 (57.0)
Bariloche	Patagonia	15.0 (59.0)	14.8 (58.6)	11.9 (53.4)	7.9 (46.2)	4.9 (40.8)	2.8 (37.0)	2.1 (35.8)	3.0 (37.4)	5.1 (41.2)	8.0 (46.4)	10.8 (51.4)	13.5 (56.3)	8.3 (46.9)
Comodoro Rivadavia	Patagonia	19.7 (67.5)	18.8 (65.8)	16.3 (61.3)	13.1 (55.6)	9.6 (49.3)	6.9 (44.4)	6.6 (43.9)	7.9 (46.2)	10.1 (50.2)	13.0 (55.4)	15.9 (60.6)	18.2 (64.8)	13.0 (55.4)
Ushuaia	Patagonia	9.7 (49.5)	9.5 (49.1)	8.0 (46.4)	6.0 (42.8)	3.8 (38.8)	1.7 (35.1)	2.4 (36.3)	2.9 (37.2)	4.2 (39.6)	6.3 (43.3)	7.7 (45.9)	8.8 (47.8)	5.9 (42.6)

=== Precipitation ===
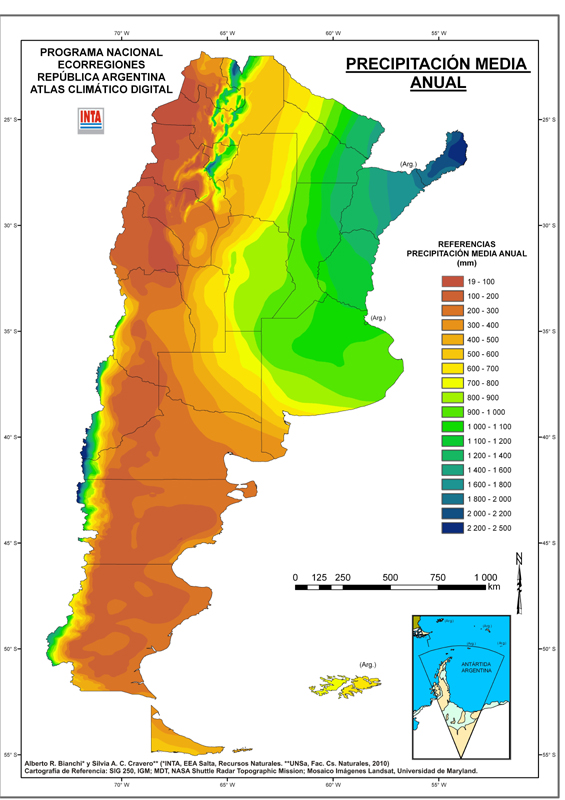
Mean annual precipitation in millimetres in Argentina (including the Falkland Islands).

Average Precipitation in various locations in Argentina in mm (in)
Location	Region	Jan	Feb	Mar	Apr	May	Jun	Jul	Aug	Sept	Oct	Nov	Dec	Annual
Salta	Northwest	192.6 (7.58)	154.2 (6.07)	110.6 (4.35)	33.0 (1.30)	8.0 (0.31)	1.5 (0.059)	3.9 (0.15)	3.8 (0.15)	7.6 (0.30)	25.1 (0.99)	62.2 (2.45)	145.6 (5.73)	748.1 (29.45)
La Quiaca	Northwest	97.5 (3.84)	68.4 (2.69)	55.9 (2.20)	8.2 (0.32)	1.0 (0.039)	0.5 (0.020)	0.0 (0)	1.4 (0.055)	3.5 (0.14)	16.0 (0.63)	27.3 (1.07)	71.9 (2.83)	351.6 (13.84)
La Rioja	Northwest	96.3 (3.79)	73.6 (2.90)	65.0 (2.56)	29.3 (1.15)	9.0 (0.35)	2.9 (0.11)	3.8 (0.15)	4.2 (0.17)	9.4 (0.37)	17.6 (0.69)	35.9 (1.41)	65.0 (2.56)	412.0 (16.22)
Santiago del Estero	Chaco Region	134.8 (5.31)	100.6 (3.96)	91.1 (3.59)	35.9 (1.41)	17.2 (0.68)	6.6 (0.26)	3.0 (0.12)	2.0 (0.079)	12.3 (0.48)	44.7 (1.76)	66.7 (2.63)	114.2 (4.50)	629.1 (24.77)
Formosa	Chaco Region	165.7 (6.52)	128.7 (5.07)	144.8 (5.70)	175.0 (6.89)	99.3 (3.91)	68.9 (2.71)	47.5 (1.87)	44.2 (1.74)	90.8 (3.57)	142.0 (5.59)	166.5 (6.56)	163.4 (6.43)	1,436.8 (56.57)
Posadas	Mesopotamia	167.2 (6.58)	154.9 (6.10)	144.1 (5.67)	193.8 (7.63)	138.2 (5.44)	139.8 (5.50)	103.3 (4.07)	93.9 (3.70)	145.1 (5.71)	226.0 (8.90)	181.0 (7.13)	179.9 (7.08)	1,867.2 (73.51)
San Juan	Cuyo	15.7 (0.62)	18.9 (0.74)	11.2 (0.44)	4.4 (0.17)	4.4 (0.17)	1.6 (0.063)	3.5 (0.14)	3.2 (0.13)	5.6 (0.22)	3.6 (0.14)	7.0 (0.28)	11.6 (0.46)	90.7 (3.57)
San Luis	Cuyo	119.5 (4.70)	97.5 (3.84)	98.9 (3.89)	41.4 (1.63)	19.8 (0.78)	5.7 (0.22)	11.2 (0.44)	8.6 (0.34)	24.3 (0.96)	40.5 (1.59)	80.4 (3.17)	110.1 (4.33)	657.9 (25.90)
Malargüe	Cuyo	25.0 (0.98)	26.4 (1.04)	33.5 (1.32)	22.9 (0.90)	26.9 (1.06)	38.7 (1.52)	34.1 (1.34)	30.1 (1.19)	23.9 (0.94)	19.6 (0.77)	22.3 (0.88)	29.6 (1.17)	333.0 (13.11)
Puente del Inca	Cuyo	4.9 (0.19)	5.8 (0.23)	4.2 (0.17)	10.5 (0.41)	68.5 (2.70)	64.9 (2.56)	49.6 (1.95)	47.9 (1.89)	16.6 (0.65)	18.1 (0.71)	10.9 (0.43)	1.2 (0.047)	302.8 (11.92)
Buenos Aires	Humid Pampas	138.8 (5.46)	127.1 (5.00)	140.1 (5.52)	119.0 (4.69)	92.3 (3.63)	58.8 (2.31)	60.6 (2.39)	64.2 (2.53)	72.0 (2.83)	127.2 (5.01)	117.3 (4.62)	118.9 (4.68)	1,236.3 (48.67)
Córdoba	Dry Pampas	126.3 (4.97)	97.0 (3.82)	112.1 (4.41)	61.3 (2.41)	18.8 (0.74)	4.5 (0.18)	13.3 (0.52)	8.9 (0.35)	35.2 (1.39)	69.8 (2.75)	112.2 (4.42)	154.6 (6.09)	814.0 (32.05)
Santa Rosa	Dry Pampas	94.6 (3.72)	81.0 (3.19)	102.3 (4.03)	58.0 (2.28)	32.9 (1.30)	15.5 (0.61)	21.5 (0.85)	28.1 (1.11)	50.9 (2.00)	74.7 (2.94)	81.7 (3.22)	104.3 (4.11)	745.5 (29.35)
Mar del Plata	Humid Pampas	94.9 (3.74)	93.9 (3.70)	96.7 (3.81)	85.5 (3.37)	66.4 (2.61)	57.4 (2.26)	55.7 (2.19)	55.9 (2.20)	57.3 (2.26)	89.3 (3.52)	81.3 (3.20)	92.8 (3.65)	926.1 (36.46)
Bariloche	Patagonia	10.0 (0.39)	15.3 (0.60)	35.2 (1.39)	58.9 (2.32)	130.1 (5.12)	170.1 (6.70)	122.1 (4.81)	101.4 (3.99)	56.5 (2.22)	49.4 (1.94)	29.3 (1.15)	23.4 (0.92)	801.7 (31.56)
Comodoro Rivadavia	Patagonia	11.6 (0.46)	14.4 (0.57)	18.2 (0.72)	25.4 (1.00)	37.4 (1.47)	35.9 (1.41)	23.4 (0.92)	20.1 (0.79)	20.1 (0.79)	16.4 (0.65)	14.5 (0.57)	10.1 (0.40)	247.5 (9.74)
Ushuaia	Patagonia	49.6 (1.95)	42.1 (1.66)	46.8 (1.84)	55.9 (2.20)	47.6 (1.87)	56.4 (2.22)	40.1 (1.58)	36.0 (1.42)	34.5 (1.36)	36.1 (1.42)	41.3 (1.63)	50.7 (2.00)	537.0 (21.14)

=== Overall averages ===
Climate data for Argentina (country–wide averages) 1961–1990
Month	Jan	Feb	Mar	Apr	May	Jun	Jul	Aug	Sep	Oct	Nov	Dec	Year
Mean daily maximum °C (°F)	28.4 (83.1)	27.4 (81.3)	24.7 (76.5)	21.0 (69.8)	17.2 (63.0)	13.9 (57.0)	14.0 (57.2)	16.3 (61.3)	19.0 (66.2)	22.2 (72.0)	25.2 (77.4)	27.5 (81.5)	21.4 (70.5)
Daily mean °C (°F)	21.4 (70.5)	20.5 (68.9)	18.1 (64.6)	14.6 (58.3)	11.2 (52.2)	8.2 (46.8)	8.0 (46.4)	9.6 (49.3)	12.1 (53.8)	15.3 (59.5)	18.1 (64.6)	20.4 (68.7)	14.8 (58.6)
Mean daily minimum °C (°F)	14.4 (57.9)	13.7 (56.7)	11.6 (52.9)	8.3 (46.9)	5.3 (41.5)	2.6 (36.7)	2.0 (35.6)	3.0 (37.4)	5.3 (41.5)	8.4 (47.1)	11.1 (52.0)	13.4 (56.1)	8.3 (46.9)
Average precipitation mm (inches)	74 (2.9)	68 (2.7)	74 (2.9)	50 (2.0)	37 (1.5)	28 (1.1)	26 (1.0)	24 (0.9)	32 (1.3)	51 (2.0)	59 (2.3)	67 (2.6)	590 (23.2)
Average precipitation days	8.1	7.3	7.4	5.9	5.3	4.9	4.8	4.3	4.7	6.2	6.8	8.0	73.7
Source: Climate Research Unit

== Extremes ==
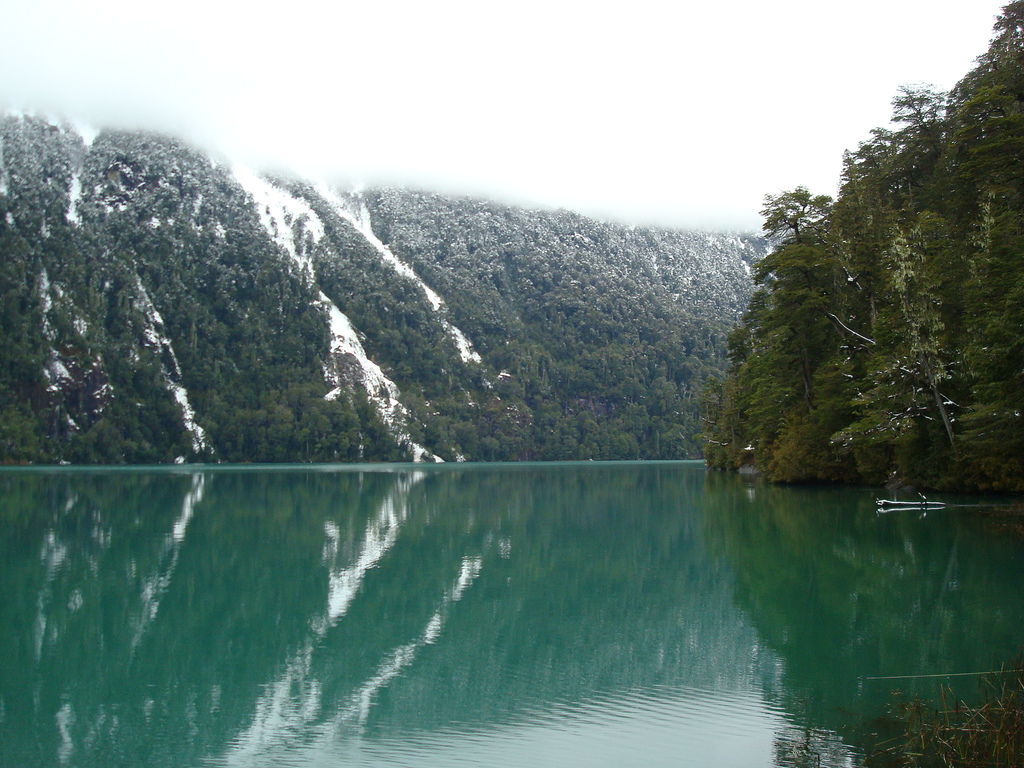
Lago Frías in Río Negro Province during winter. It is considered to be the wettest place in Argentina.

=== High ===
In general, the highest temperatures in Argentina are recorded in the northern Chaco region where temperatures of 45 to 50 °C (113 to 122 °F) have been recorded. According to the World Meteorological Organization, the highest temperature ever recorded in Argentina and South America was 48.9 °C (120.0 °F) in Rivadavia, Salta Province on 11 December 1905. Since 1961 when nationwide temperature monitoring began, the warmest year on record is 2017 when mean temperatures nationally were 0.68 °C (1 °F) above the mean national temperatures based on the 1981–2010 reference period.

=== Low ===
Patagonia and the Puna region register the lowest temperatures in Argentina where temperatures lower than −20 °C (−4 °F) have been recorded. The lowest temperature ever recorded in Argentina and South America was −32.8 °C (−27.0 °F) in Sarmiento, Chubut Province on 1 June 1907. This was recorded under standard conditions. On a national scale, the coldest year on record is 1975 when mean temperatures nationally were −0.76 °C (−1 °F) below the mean national temperatures based on the 1981–2010 reference period.

=== Precipitation ===
With an average annual precipitation of 3,668 mm (144.4 in), Lago Frías in Río Negro Province is considered to be the wettest place in Argentina. Although an average annual precipitation of 6,251 mm (246.1 in) has been recorded in Lago Tromen in Neuquén Province, the validity of the data is dubious owing to fewer years of data. Lago Frías also has the record for wettest monthly precipitation in Argentina: 1,147 mm (45.2 in) of precipitation was recorded in May 1951. In contrast, the driest place is La Casualidad, Salta Province, which has received as low as only a 0.4 mm (0.016 in) of precipitation in a year. The highest recorded one-day rainfall total occurred on 2 April 2013, when 392.2 mm (15.44 in) of rain fell in La Plata at the La Plata Astronomical Observatory, causing massive flooding and power outages.

On a national scale, the wettest year on record is 1985 when annual precipitation in the country was 29.6% higher than the mean annual precipitation (based on a reference period of 1981–2010). The driest year on record in the country is 1988 when annual precipitation was 29.9% lower than the mean annual precipitation (based on a reference period of 1981–2010).

=== Other severe weather ===
The longest duration for a single lightning flash globally was recorded in Argentina on 18 June 2020 along the Argentina–Uruguay border, when it lasted for 17.1 seconds.

== Natural disasters ==
=== Floods ===
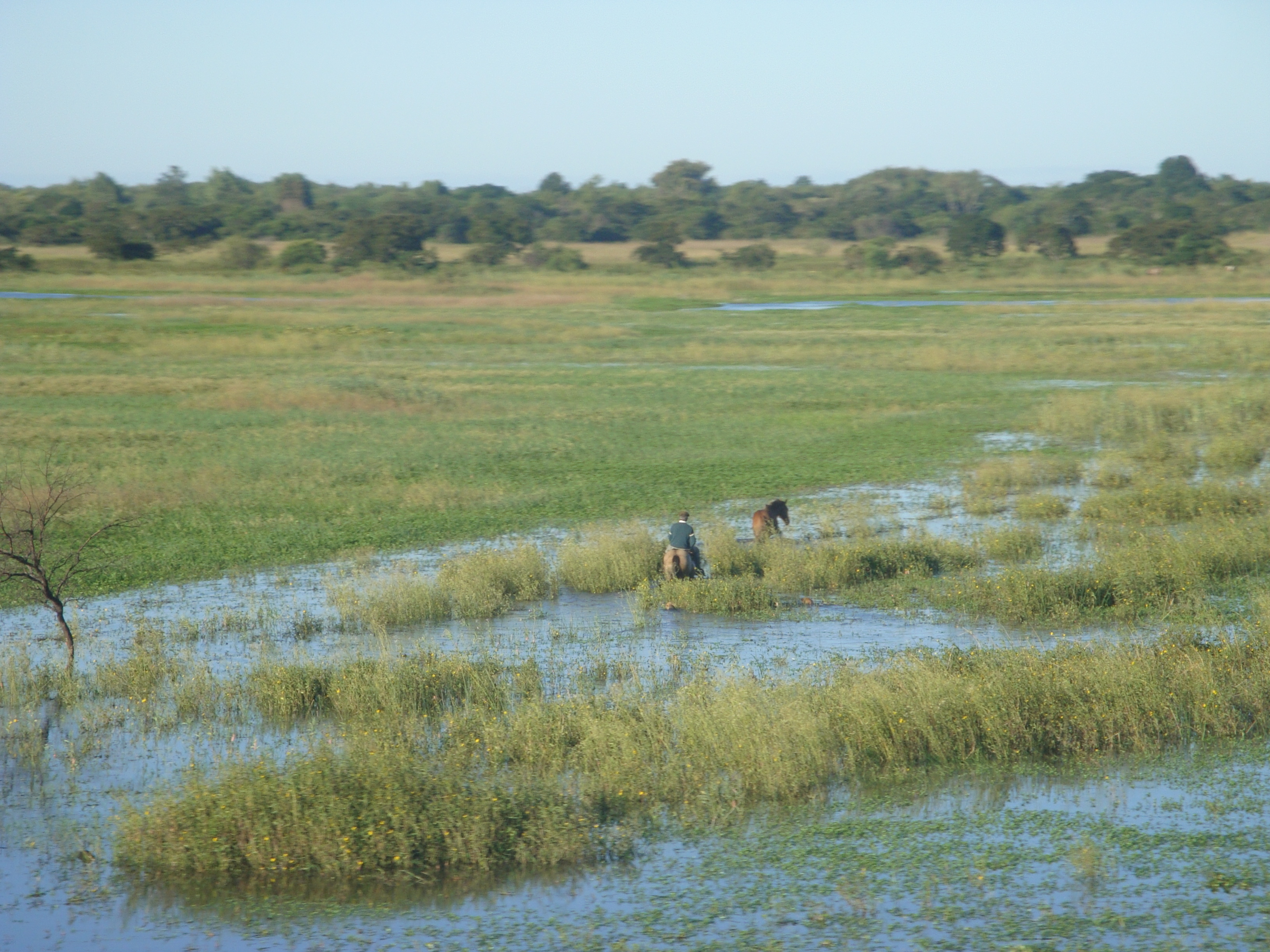
The Pampas are vulnerable to flooding owing to their flat topography and poor water drainage.

Argentina's geomorphic characteristics make the country highly vulnerable to floods. These floods can damage infrastructure, cause loss of life, increase the risk of diseases, and negatively impact agricultural productivity, which is one of the main economic activities of the country. Many of the large Argentinean cities and agriculturally productive areas lie near rivers. The plains are at highest risk for flooding, particularly in the northeastern and central parts of the country, including Greater Buenos Aires. This is because these plains, which cover 35% of the land area in the country (including the Chaco and Pampean areas), are characterized by a flat landscape, which can impede proper water drainage. Both the Parana and Paraguay basins have a flat landscape and are thus highly susceptible to flooding due to river overflows following high rainfall. These floods can last for months, particularly in the Parana River, owing to its large basin. In the most extreme case, during the year 1982–1983, the floods in the Parana River persisted for more than a year, negatively impacting the area both socially and economically. Major flooding events in the Parana River include those of 1992 and 1997 and have been more frequent since the 1980s due to higher precipitation trends. Similarly, in Buenos Aires Province, flooding occurs due to river overflows and poor water drainage; major flooding events in the province occurred in 1987, 2002/2003, 2012 and in 2014, causing damage to agriculture production. Most of the flooding events occur in El Niño years owing to higher rainfall. Flooding can also affect Patagonia and urban centers in the northwest, but the number of people affected and economic losses are lower than those in the Pampas owing to lower population densities. Flooding can jeopardize access to safe water. A leptospirosis outbreak occurred following a flood in 1998.

=== Droughts and dust storms ===
Droughts are the most harmful natural disasters that are difficult to monitor, identify, analyse, and to manage. Events of droughts have considerable and serious negative impacts socially and economically. In the case of Argentina, it is highly dependent on rainfall in order to sustain production related to cereals and oilseeds. Argentina is highly dependent on water supplies originating outside its borders, making it highly vulnerable to changes in water supply due to climate change. In arid parts of the country, agricultural production is highly dependent on irrigation, making it vulnerable to droughts as they can reduce the availability of water which can negatively affect the commercial production of agricultural products or food security for smaller producers that depend on agriculture to feed their families. Droughts are frequent and devastating. Several years of droughts during the last decade have severely affected agricultural production and reduced economic growth. In 2018, a severe drought affected the country from the final months of 2017 to April 2018 was the worst in the last 50 years and one of the 10 most destructive climate related events in the world in 2018. Rainfall in some parts of the country were 50% below normal from December to February. As a result of this, yields of soybeans and maize were reduced by 31% and 20% respectively, both of which make up 37% of all of Argentina's exports. The drought lead to $6 billion in losses and caused the country to enter into a recession. It was labelled by some to be the most expensive disaster on record. Before the drought in 2018, a drought in 2009 was previously the worst drought in more than 50 years. Many cattle died of hunger, and huge swaths of soy, corn and wheat fields were affected. It was estimated that the country lost more than US$5 billion from the drought. A drought in 2011 affected farming of soy and corn, causing losses of US$2.5 billion.

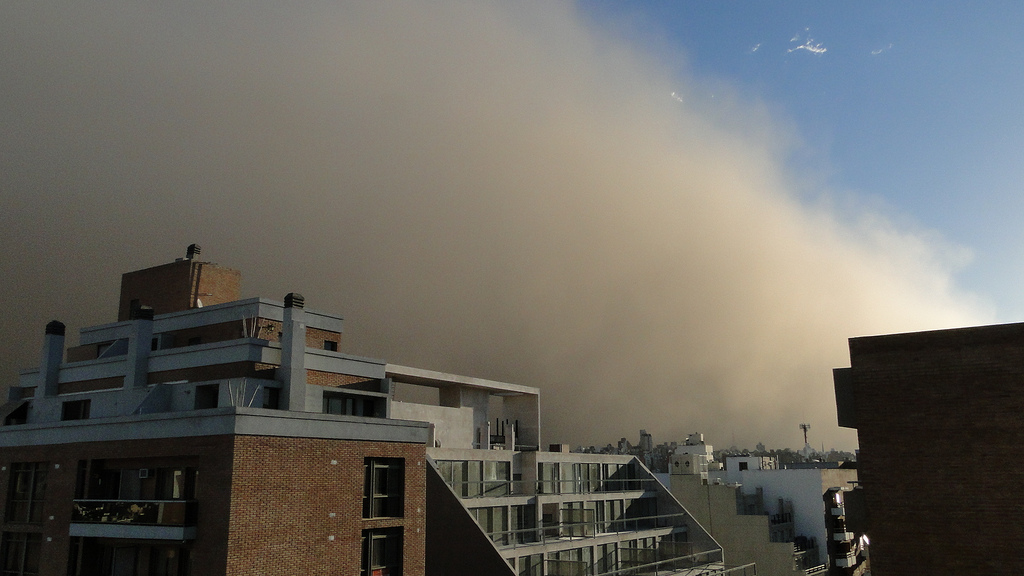
A dust storm in Córdoba.

Drier parts of the country are highly prone to dust storms. These include areas west of Buenos Aires, which can average more than eight dust storms per year, and parts of Patagonia, owing to its aridity and windy climate. Certain areas in the Altiplano are also highly prone to dust storms owing to extensive areas of closed depressions and the presence of salt flats that erode the rock, which becomes a source of fine material that can travel large distances during periods of strong wind. Dust storms are more frequent during droughts, particularly in agricultural areas. Dust storms can effect large areas, leading to numerous impacts. These dust storms can lead to loss of crop and livestock, affecting the local economy. Productive topsoil may be lost during dust storms, leading to loss in soil productivity, which can increase soil erosion and negatively affect crop productivity in the long term. In addition to the impact on agriculture, dust storms can damage cars and buildings, lower visibility on roads, affect air quality, and affect water quality in rivers and lakes.

=== Tornadoes and severe weather ===
Argentina experiences frequent tornadoes each year. Tornadoes occur in the South American "tornado alley" (Spanish: Pasillo de los Tornados), which includes the provinces of Entre Ríos, Córdoba Province, Santa Fe, La Pampa and Greater Buenos Aires. The frequency of tornadoes is similar to the one found in Tornado Alley in North America. However, there is no exact number of tornado occurrences per year, owing to the lack of data. These regions have the most frequent and intense mesoscale convective systems. Tornadoes occur between November and April. In this region, which occupies most of the Pampas, cold air from Patagonia meets warm, humid air from Brazil with dry air coming from the Andes. When these air masses collide, they can produce intense storms, frequently becoming supercells that can produce tornadoes. With a larger number of convective storms, there is a higher chance that some of these storms will produce tornadoes. Most tornadoes are relatively weak and rarely cause deaths. The strongest tornado recorded in Argentina occurred in 1973 when a tornado struck San Justo, Santa Fe. The tornado was an F5 on the Fujita scale, with winds > 418 km/h (260 mph), making it the worst tornado in Latin America and the Caribbean.

Severe storms impact large cities more often and can damage cars, houses and disrupt public services such as transportation and collection and disposal of urban solid waste. The foothills of the Andes and the Sierras de Cordoba are vulnerable to hail. This is because the Andes force humid air from the Atlantic upwards, intensifying the updrafts within thunderstorms, making hail more likely. Mendoza, a city located in the Andean foothills, experiences frequent hailstorms that can impact the agriculture of the region. Hailstorms have caused serious losses in both urban and rural areas. It is estimated that wine and fruit production experience yearly losses of US$50 million and US$30 million, respectively, due to hail. Most of these hailstorms occur in the summer although they can occur in winter, particularly in the east where warm and humid air from the north frequently collides with cold air from the south, leading to convective thunderstorms that can produce hail.

Storm surges caused by extratropical cyclones have been recorded along the coastal areas. These storm surges are formed from strong winds that blow towards the land. They are formed due to the interaction between the semi-permanent South Pacific High and a low pressure system over the Atlantic, southeast of Argentina, creating strong winds from the south or southwest. The sudestada, which brings the worst storm surges, occurs when there is a high pressure system over southern Argentina in the Atlantic Ocean that interacts with a low pressure over Uruguay and southern Brazil, causing strong winds from the southeast. Storm surges have caused flooding of coastal areas, leading to extensive property loss and other damage. It is also the main natural factor in the erosion of coastlines. The flooding as a result of storm surges are particularly destructive in flat coastal areas such as the Rio de La Plata shores, and the Salado Basin.

=== Snowstorms and cold waves ===
Argentina regularly receives cold air from the south that can reach low latitudes owing to the influence of the Andes. Cold waves are usually accompanied with severe snowstorms or extremely cold conditions that can have a devastating impact on the country's economy. These snowstorms and/or extremely cold conditions can partially or completely paralyze activities in large areas of Patagonia and the center of the country. In addition, cold conditions can lead to energy shortages during the winter months due to increased demand. The low temperatures brought by these cold waves can cause frosts that can damage plants, severely affecting agricultural production and devastating the local economy.

== Climate change ==
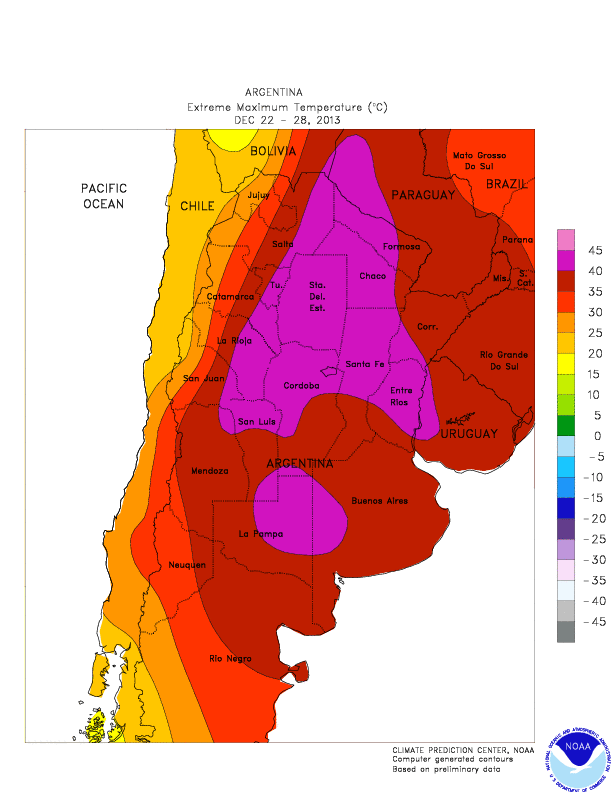
High temperatures reached during the December 2013 heat wave, the longest and most severe ever recorded in Argentina.

According to the national government and scientists, climate change is predicted to have a significant effect on the climate of Argentina. There has been an increase in annual precipitation in almost all of Argentina during the 20th century, particularly in the northeast and the center of the country, where agricultural production has expanded to the west by more than 100 km (62 mi) in areas that were previously too dry during middle of the 20th century. In contrast, the Andean part of Patagonia, along with the Cuyo region, has seen a decrease in precipitation, leading to a reduction in river flow in the last 100 years. These trends were observed with an increase in the river–stream flows in most of the country, excluding rivers originating from the Andes, and an increase in extreme precipitation events that led to considerable socioeconomic losses.

Mean temperatures have increased by 0.5 °C (0.9 °F) between 1901 and 2012, slightly lower than the global average. Temperatures in the Andean part of Patagonia have increased by more than 1 °C (1.8 °F), which has caused the retreat of almost all of the glaciers. This is affecting water availability to the arid areas of the country that depend on glacier meltwater. Higher temperatures can reduce winter snowfall, causing river flow to decrease, which in turn can reduce hydroelectric energy production; losses of up to 40% have been observed. There has been a decrease in the number of days with frost, and there have been increases in the frequency of hot nights and heat waves throughout the country.

Within the next two or three decades (2016–2035), mean temperatures are predicted to increase by 0.5 to 1.0 °C (0.9 to 1.8 °F) under the two scenarios (RCP 4.5 and RCP 8.5) from the IPCC Fifth Assessment Report. In both scenarios, the projected monkeying will be more pronounced during the summer months. The predicted trend for precipitation is not as clear as the one for temperature. In the northern and central regions, precipitation is predicted to increase while in most of central–western Argentina and Patagonia, precipitation is predicted to decrease.

Scientists predict that glaciers will continue to recede and melt or, in some areas, disappear. It is also predicted that the Cuyo region could face a potential water crisis due to an increase in water demand caused by a reduction in river streamflows. In the north and central parts of the country, the higher temperatures and lower precipitation projected for this region will lead to higher evaporation, intensifying droughts and leading to desertification. Heat waves could become more frequent and intense, negatively impacting agricultural production while placing more demand on energy needs. Intense precipitation could become more common, increasing the likelihood of suffering from events such as flooding, since most of its population lives in urban areas near a body of water (rivers, lakes and oceans). Though most of the coastal regions of Argentina will not suffer permanent flooding associated with sea level rise, it is predicted that storm surges will become more frequent in coastal areas, affecting locations such as Buenos Aires.

== See also ==
- Agriculture in Argentina
- Servicio Meteorológico Nacional (Argentina)
- Climate of Buenos Aires
- Geography of Argentina
- Geographical regions of Argentina
- Environment of Argentina
- Glaciers of Argentina
