= Rivadavia Department, Salta =

Rivadavia Departamento Rivadavia
- Department
- Interactive map of Rivadavia
- Country: Argentina
- State: Salta Province
- Seat: Rivadavia

Rivadavia is a department of the province of Salta (Argentina).

== Municipalities and villages ==
The department of Rivadavia comprises three municipalities:

- Coronel Juan Solá
- Rivadavia Banda Sur
- Santa Victoria Este

Furthermore, the following villages are part of the department of Rivadavia:

- Alto de la Sierra
- Capitan Juan Pagé
- La Unión
- Los Blancos
- Santa María
- Santa Rosa
- Pluma de Pato
