= Rivadavia Department =

Rivadavia Department may refer to several departments in Argentina:

- Rivadavia Department, Buenos Aires
- Rivadavia Department, Mendoza
- Rivadavia Department, Salta
- Rivadavia Department, San Juan
- Rivadavia Department, Santiago del Estero

== See also ==
- Rivadavia
