= Trewartha climate classification =

Climate classification system

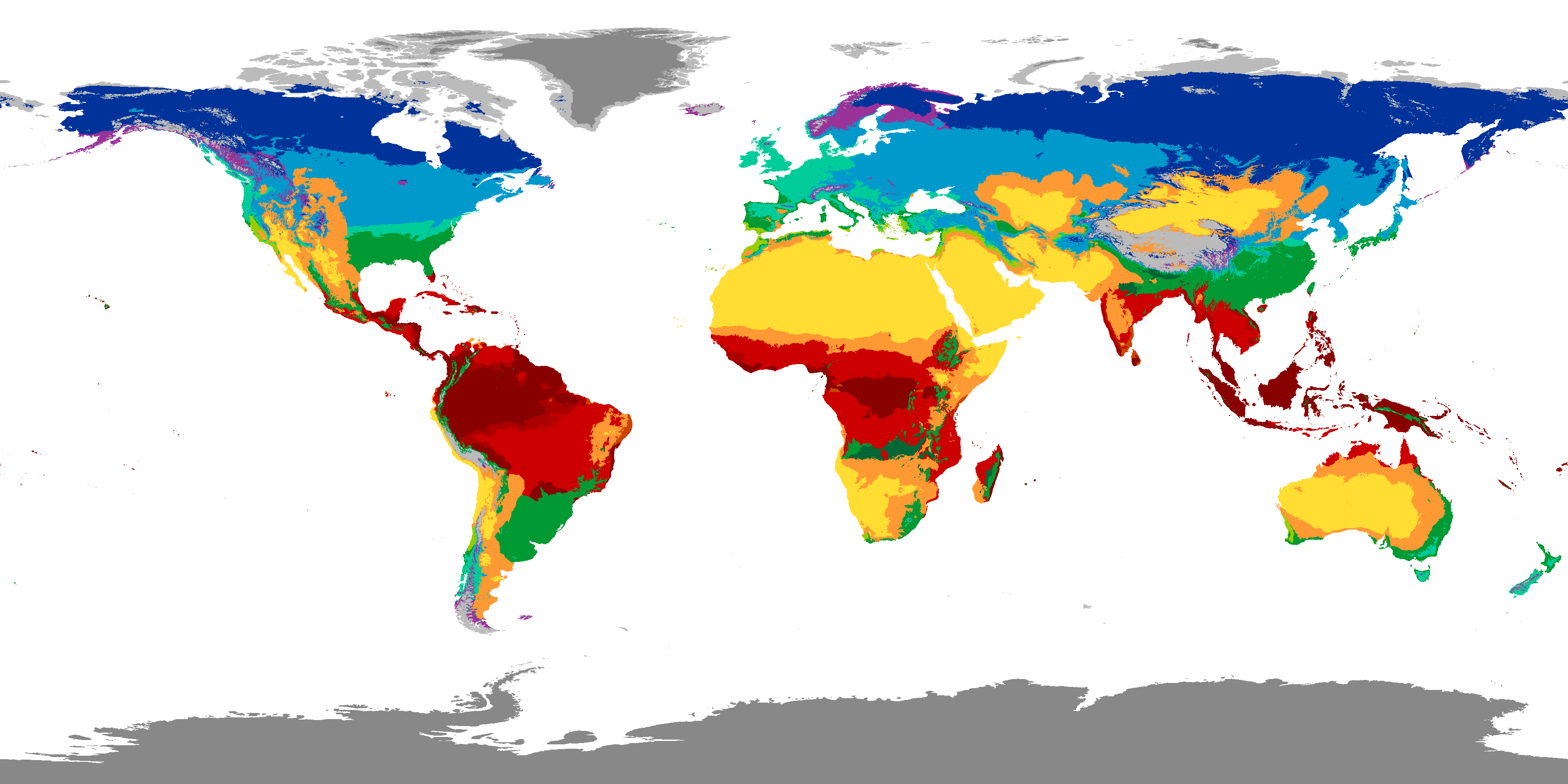
World map of the Trewartha climate classification, with 1991-2020 normals: Ar: Tropical Wet; Am: Tropical Monsoon; Aw: Tropical Dry-Winter; As: Tropical Dry-Summer; Bw: Desert or Arid; Bs: Steppe or Semiarid; Cs: Subtropical Dry Summer; Cw: Subtropical Monsoon; Cf: Subtropical Humid; Do: Temperate Oceanic; Dc: Temperate Continental; Eo: Boreal Oceanic; Ec: Boreal Continental; Ft: Tundra; Fi: Ice Cap

The Trewartha climate classification (TCC), or the Köppen–Trewartha climate classification (KTC), is a climate classification system first published by American geographer Glenn Thomas Trewartha in 1966. It is a modified version of the Köppen–Geiger system, created to answer some of its deficiencies. The Trewartha system attempts to redefine the middle latitudes to be closer to vegetation zoning and genetic climate systems.

== Scheme ==
Trewartha's modifications to the 1884 Köppen climate system sought to reclass the middle latitudes into three groups, according to how many months have a mean temperature of 10 °C (50 °F) or higher:

- C (subtropical)—8 or more months;
- D (temperate)—4 to 7 months;
- E (boreal)—1 to 3 months.

The tropical climates and polar climates remained the same as in the original Köppen climate classification.

=== Group A: Tropical climates ===
This is the tropical climate realm, defined the same as in Köppen's scheme (i.e., all 12 months average 18 °C (64.4 °F) or above). The A climates are the realm of the winterless frost-free zone.

- Climates with no more than two dry months (defined as having less than 60 mm (2.4 inches) average precipitation, same as per Köppen) are classified Ar.
- Others are classified Aw if the dry season is at the time of low-sun/short days or As if the dry season is at the time of high-sun/long days.

There was no specific monsoon climate identifier in the original scheme, but Am was added later, with the same parameters as Köppen's (except that at least three months, rather than one, must have less than 60 mm average precipitation).

=== Group B: Dry (arid and semi-arid) climates ===
BW and BS mean the same as in the Köppen scheme. However, a different formula is used to quantify the aridity threshold: 10(T − 10) + 3P, with T equaling the mean annual temperature in degrees Celsius, and P denoting the percentage of total precipitation received in the six high-sun months (April through September in the Northern Hemisphere, October through March in the Southern).

- If the precipitation for a given location is less than the above formula — that is, if P < 10(T − 10) + 3P — the climate is said to be that of a desert (BW).
- If it is equal to or greater than the formula but less than twice that amount, the climate is classified as steppe (BS).
- If the precipitation is more than double the value of the formula, the climate is not in Group B.

Unlike in Köppen's scheme, no thermal subsets exist within this group in Trewartha's, unless the Universal Thermal Scale (see below) is used.

=== Group C: Subtropical climates ===
In the Trewartha scheme the C climate group encompasses subtropical climates, which have 8 or more months with a mean temperature of 10 °C (50 °F) or higher. There are only three types within the C or subtropical climate group:

- Cs, which is a dry-summer or mediterranean climate;
- Cf, or humid subtropical climate with no dry season;
- Cw, a monsoon-influenced humid subtropical climate with dry winters.

=== Group D: Temperate and continental climates ===
In the Trewartha scheme the D climate group encompasses temperate climates that have 4 to 7 months with a mean temperature of 10 °C (50 °F) or higher. D climate groups have two types:

- Oceanic (Do), where the coldest month has a mean temperature 0 °C (32 °F) or higher
- Continental (Dc), where the coldest monthly mean temperature reaches below 0 °C, as in some interior landmasses in North America and Asia. For the continental climates (Dc), sometimes a third letter (a or b) is added to denote a hot or cold summer. Dca is used where the warmest month has a mean temperature of 22.2 °C (72.0 °F) or higher, and Dcb is used for cool-summer temperate climates, where the warmest month has a mean temperature below 22.2 °C.

Most of Europe north of the 44th parallel exhibits a Do or Dc climate type.

=== Group E: Boreal climates ===
This represents subarctic and subpolar oceanic climate realms, defined the same as in Köppen's scheme, where 1 to 3 months have an average temperature of 10 °C (50 °F) or above. In this climate zone there is only a short period (normally 50 to 90 days) that is frost free. In the original scheme, this group was not further divided; later, the designations Eo and Ec were created:

- Eo (maritime subarctic) signifies that the coldest month averages above −10 °C (14 °F).
- Ec (continental subarctic or "boreal") means that at least one month has an average temperature of −10 °C or below.

As in Group D, a third letter can be added to indicate seasonality of precipitation. There are no separate counterparts to the Köppen Dfd, Dwd, and Dsd climate types in Trewartha's scheme, but a letter can optionally be added to the end of the symbol to indicate the temperature of the coldest month (see below).

=== Group F: Polar climates ===
This is the polar climate group, where all months have a monthly mean air temperature below 10 °C (50 °F). Polar climates have two subtypes, Ft (tundra) and Fi (ice cap):

- In the Ft climate type, at least one month has an average temperature above 0 °C (32 °F) (but not above 10 °C (50 °F)), so that there is a brief time when the surface might be free of snow or ice and a scrub or tundra vegetation cover is possible.
- In the Fi climate type, all months have an average temperature below 0 °C (32 °F). This is the region of the vast deserts of perpetually frozen ocean in the North Pole, and the permanent ice plateaus of Antarctica and Greenland.

== Universal Thermal Scale ==
An option exists to include information on both the warmest and coldest months for every climate by adding a third and fourth letter respectively. The letters, denoting mean monthly temperature, conform to the following scale:

Code	Description	Temperature range
i	Severely hot	35 °C (95 °F) or higher
h	Very hot	28 to 34.9 °C (82.4 to 94.8 °F)
a	Hot	22.2 to 27.9 °C (72.0 to 82.2 °F)
b	Warm	18 to 22.1 °C (64.4 to 71.8 °F)
l	Mild	10 to 17.9 °C (50.0 to 64.2 °F)
k	Cool	0.1 to 9.9 °C (32.2 to 49.8 °F)
o	Cold	0 to −9.99 °C (32.0 to 14.0 °F)
c	Very cold	−10 to −24.9 °C (14.0 to −12.8 °F)
d	Severely cold	−25 to −39.9 °C (−13.0 to −39.8 °F)
e	Excessively cold	−40 °C (−40 °F) or below

== Examples ==
=== A ===
- Arhh for Singapore or Funafuti, Tuvalu
- Arha for Kuala Lumpur, Malaysia or Colombo, Sri Lanka
- Arhb for Santos, Brazil or Fort Lauderdale, Florida, United States or Ishigaki, Japan
- Araa for Suva, Fiji or Quibdó, Colombia
- Arab for Easter Island, Chile or Innisfail, Australia
- Arbb for Mamasa, Indonesia
- Amha for Manila, Philippines or Jakarta, Indonesia
- Amhb for Miami, Florida, United States or Wanning, China
- Amaa for Monrovia, Liberia or Cali, Colombia
- Amab for Cairns, Australia
- Awha for Cuiabá, Brazil or Mumbai, India or Surabaya, Indonesia
- Awhb for Rio de Janeiro, Brazil or Dhaka, Bangladesh or Naples, Florida, United States
- Awaa for Brazzaville, Republic of the Congo or Goiânia, Brazil
- Awab for Maputo, Mozambique
- Awbb for Guatemala City, Guatemala or Malanje, Angola
- Asha for Chennai, India or Mombasa, Kenya
- Asaa for Fortaleza, Brazil or Kapalua, Hawaii, United States
- Asab for Lanai City, Hawaii, United States

=== B ===
- BWih for Dallol, Ethiopia
- BWia for Khartoum, Sudan
- BWib for Tessalit, Mali or Dubai, United Arab Emirates
- BWil for Riyadh, Saudi Arabia or Phoenix, Arizona, United States
- BWik for Tikrit, Iraq
- BWha for Punto Fijo, Venezuela
- BWhb/BShb for Karachi, Pakistan
- BWhl for Alice Springs, Australia or Cairo, Egypt
- BWhk for Las Vegas, Nevada, United States or Qom, Iran
- BWho for Turpan, China or Nukus, Uzbekistan
- BWal for Almería, Spain or Lima, Peru or Iquique, Chile
- BWak for Neuquén, Argentina
- BWao for Leh, India or Yinchuan, China
- BWac for Aral, Kazakhstan or Karamay, China
- BWbl for Antofagasta, Chile or Sanaa, Yemen
- BWbo for Bamyan, Afghanistan
- BWbc for Khovd, Mongolia
- BWll for Walvis Bay, Namibia or Arequipa, Peru
- BWlc for Ölgii, Mongolia
- BSil for Dezful, Iran
- BShh for Mossoró, Brazil
- BSha for Petrolina, Brazil or Accra, Ghana
- BShb for Luanda, Angola or Ahmedabad, India
- BShl for Murcia, Spain or Rivadavia, Argentina or Piraeus, Greece
- BShk for Mashhad, Iran
- BSaa for Barquisimeto, Venezuela or Honolulu, Hawaii, United States
- BSab for Toliara, Madagascar
- BSal for Tripoli, Libya
- BSak for Baku, Azerbaijan
- BSak/BSao for Boise, Idaho, United States
- BSao for Denver, Colorado, United States or Yerevan, Armenia
- BSbl for Cochabamba, Bolivia
- BSbk for Alexandra, New Zealand
- BSbo for Kamloops, Canada
- BSbc for Ulaanbaatar, Mongolia
- BSbd for Kyzyl, Russia
- BSll for Asmara, Eritrea
- BSlk for Río Gallegos, Argentina or Lhasa, Tibet, China

=== C ===
- Cfhl for Houston, Texas, United States or Austin, Texas, United States or Orlando, Florida, United States or Asunción, Paraguay
- Cfhk for Tokyo, Japan or Hangzhou, China or Dallas, Texas, United States
- Cfal for São Paulo, Brazil or Buenos Aires, Argentina or Montevideo, Uruguay or Sydney, Australia or Porto Alegre, Brazil
- Cfak for Nashville, Tennessee, United States
- Cfbl for A Coruña, Spain or Auckland, New Zealand or Curitiba, Brazil
- Cfbk for Bilbao, Spain or Melbourne, Australia
- Cfll for Campos do Jordão, Brazil or Bogotá, Colombia or Quito, Ecuador
- Cflk for São Joaquim, Brazil or Hobart, Australia or Isles of Scilly, United Kingdom or Wellington, New Zealand
- Cwil for New Delhi, India
- Cwhl for Las Lomitas, Argentina or Islamabad, Pakistan or Hanoi, Vietnam
- Cwhk for Chongqing, China
- Cwal for Guadalajara, Mexico or Córdoba, Argentina
- Cwak for Chengdu, China or Changwon, South Korea
- Cwbl for Mexico City, Mexico or Addis Ababa, Ethiopia or Baguio, Philippines
- Cwbk for Johannesburg, South Africa or Kunming, China
- Cwll for Cusco, Peru or Sucre, Bolivia
- Cwlk for La Paz, Bolivia or Gangtok, India
- Cshl for Seville, Spain or Patras, Greece
- Cshk for Tashkent, Uzbekistan or Urfa, Turkey
- Csal for Nice, France or Los Angeles, California, United States or Perth, Australia or Monte Carlo, Monaco
- Csak for Marseille, France or Rome, Italy or Madrid, Spain
- Csbl for Oeiras, Portugal or Santa Barbara, California, United States
- Csbk for Porto, Portugal or Santiago, Chile
- Csll for San Francisco, California, United States or Camariñas, Spain
- Cslk for Eureka, California, United States or Concepción, Chile

=== D ===
- Dohk for Diyarbakır, Turkey or Kermanshah, Iran
- Doak for New York City, New York, United States or Milan, Italy
- Dobk for London, United Kingdom or Vancouver, Canada or Frankfurt, Germany or Copenhagen, Denmark or Seattle, Washington, United States or Zurich, Switzerland
- Dolk for Dublin, Ireland or Bergen, Norway or Stavanger, Norway or Puerto Montt, Chile or Skrova, Norway
- Dcho for Arak, Iran or Setif, Algeria
- Dcao for Seoul, South Korea or Chicago, Illinois, United States or Boston, Massachusetts, United States
- Dcac for Harbin, China or Orenburg, Russia
- Dcbo for Missoula, Montana, United States or Klagenfurt, Austria or Helsinki, Finland
- Dcbc for Quebec City, Canada or Novosibirsk, Russia
- Dcbd for Hulunbuir, China or Chegdomyn, Russia
- Dclo for Cortina d'Ampezzo, Italy or Juneau, Alaska, United States
- Dclc for Dras, India or Fairbanks, Alaska, United States or Ardahan, Turkey
- Dcld for Baruunturuun, Mongolia

=== E ===
- Eolk for Punta Arenas, Chile or El Alto, Bolivia or Reykjavík, Iceland or Tórshavn, Faroe Islands
- Eolo for Tromsø, Norway or Anchorage, Alaska, United States
- Ecbc for Surgut, Russia
- Ecbd for Yakutsk, Russia or Vilyuysk, Russia or Mohe City, China
- Eclc for Karasjok, Norway or Whitehorse, Canada
- Ecld for Yellowknife, Canada or Norilsk, Russia
- Ecle for Verkhoyansk, Russia or Oymyakon, Russia

=== F ===
- Ftkk for Ushuaia, Argentina or Puerto Williams, Chile or Puerto Toro, Chile
- Ftko for Nuuk, Greenland, Denmark or Finse, Norway or Villa Las Estrellas, Antarctica, Chile
- Ftkc for Longyearbyen, Svalbard, Norway or Esperanza Base, Antarctica, Argentina or Provideniya, Russia or Ittoqqortoormiit, Greenland or Utqiagvik, Alaska, United States or Qaanaaq, Greenland
- Ftkd for Pevek, Russia or Iqaluit, Canada or Alert, Nunavut, Canada or Resolute, Nunavut, Canada
- Ftke for Eureka, Canada
- Fioo for Puncak Jaya, Indonesia
- Fioc for Showa Station, Antarctica
- Fiod for Ushakov Island, Russia or McMurdo Station, Antarctica
- Ficd for Mount Everest, China/Nepal
- Fice for Summit Camp, Greenland
- Fide for Concordia Station, Antarctica, France and Italy or Vostok Station, Antarctica, Russia

== See also ==
- Holdridge life zones climate classification by three dimensions: precipitation, humidity, and potential evapotranspiration ratio
- Köppen climate classification
