= Capitán Juan Pagé =

Coordinates: 23°41′S 62°23′W

- Municipality and village
- Interactive map of Capitán Juan Pagé
- Country: Argentina
- Province: Salta Province
- Time zone: UTC−3 (ART)

Capitán Juan Pagé is a village and rural municipality in the Rivadavia department in Salta Province in northwestern Argentina. The village had 250 inhabitants (2010), most of which are Wichi.
