= Santa María, Salta =

Coordinates: 22°08′S 62°49′W

Santa María (Salta)
- Municipality and village
- Interactive map of Santa María (Salta)
- Country: Argentina
- Province: Salta Province
- Time zone: UTC−3 (ART)

Santa María (Salta) is a village and rural municipality in Salta Province in northwestern Argentina.
