= Rivadavia, Salta =

Rivadavia
- Location in Argentina
- Coordinates: 24°11′0″S 62°53′0″W
- Elevation: 206 m (676 ft)

Population (2001)
  - Total: 8,108
- Time zone: UTC−3 (ART)
- Postal code: A4535
- Area code: +54 387
- Climate: BSh

Rivadavia is a town in eastern Salta Province, Argentina in the Department of Rivadavia, 87 kilometres (54 mi) from the city of Salta. It is in a low-lying region of the province.

== Geography ==
=== Climate ===
Rivadavia has a hot semi-arid climate (BSh) according to the Köppen climate classification. Using the Trewartha climate classification the climate is semi-arid with very hot summers and mild winters, being classified as BShl.

Temperature extremes can be very high in the summer especially in early summer before the heaviest and most persistent rain. The highest temperature ever recorded in South America was held by Rivadavia, when it peaked at 48.9 °C (120.0 °F) on December 11, 1905.

Climate data for Rivadavia, Argentina (1961-1990, extremes 1905-present)
Month	Jan	Feb	Mar	Apr	May	Jun	Jul	Aug	Sep	Oct	Nov	Dec	Year
Record high °C (°F)	46.5 (115.7)	46.5 (115.7)	45.0 (113.0)	40.2 (104.4)	37.3 (99.1)	35.0 (95.0)	38.0 (100.4)	41.2 (106.2)	45.5 (113.9)	45.2 (113.4)	46.0 (114.8)	48.9 (120.0)	48.9 (120.0)
Mean daily maximum °C (°F)	36.2 (97.2)	34.4 (93.9)	32.4 (90.3)	28.6 (83.5)	25.8 (78.4)	22.7 (72.9)	24.0 (75.2)	27.0 (80.6)	29.7 (85.5)	33.2 (91.8)	34.4 (93.9)	35.5 (95.9)	30.3 (86.5)
Daily mean °C (°F)	28.2 (82.8)	27.1 (80.8)	25.5 (77.9)	22.1 (71.8)	19.2 (66.6)	15.9 (60.6)	16.0 (60.8)	18.3 (64.9)	21.4 (70.5)	25.1 (77.2)	26.6 (79.9)	27.8 (82.0)	22.8 (73.0)
Mean daily minimum °C (°F)	22.5 (72.5)	21.5 (70.7)	20.3 (68.5)	17.2 (63.0)	14.2 (57.6)	10.8 (51.4)	9.9 (49.8)	11.4 (52.5)	14.2 (57.6)	18.0 (64.4)	20.0 (68.0)	21.4 (70.5)	16.8 (62.2)
Record low °C (°F)	10.1 (50.2)	11.0 (51.8)	8.6 (47.5)	3.0 (37.4)	−0.6 (30.9)	−3.0 (26.6)	−5.3 (22.5)	−3.2 (26.2)	−1.0 (30.2)	4.0 (39.2)	4.0 (39.2)	10.4 (50.7)	−5.3 (22.5)
Average rainfall mm (inches)	128.1 (5.04)	97.7 (3.85)	91.3 (3.59)	64.4 (2.54)	16.7 (0.66)	10.9 (0.43)	4.4 (0.17)	4.1 (0.16)	13.6 (0.54)	42.9 (1.69)	76.6 (3.02)	115.3 (4.54)	666.0 (26.22)
Average rainy days (≥ 0.1 mm)	9	9	10	8	6	4	3	1	2	5	9	9	75
Average relative humidity (%)	66	66	72	78	75	73	66	58	55	54	62	65	66
Mean monthly sunshine hours	248	254	248	180	186	120	155	217	210	248	240	248	2,554
Mean daily sunshine hours	8	9	8	6	6	4	5	7	7	8	8	8	7
Source 1: NOAA, Meteo Climat (record highs and lows)
Source 2: Servicio Meteorológico Nacional (precipitation days 1961–1990, humidity 1981-1990) Deutscher Wetterdienst (sun)
