= Mate Cocido (outlaw) =

Argentinian bandit

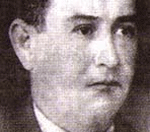
David Segundo Peralta

David Segundo Peralta (3 March 1897– possibly 7 January 1940), also known as Mate Cosido, a nickname given to him because of a scar on his forehead, was a notorious Argentine outlaw, train and bank robber, and rural bandit in north-eastern Argentina.

== Biography ==
He was born on 3 March 1897 in Monteros, Tucumán Province, Argentina.

On 7 January 1940, he was shot in the hip by Gendarmeria Nacional Argentina while collecting the ransom from the kidnapping of a rancher in Villa Berthet, Chaco province. He was never seen again, and it is believed that he died from his wounds.
