= Aurelio Díaz =

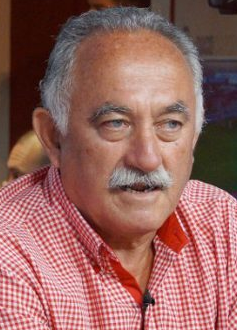
Aurelio Díaz

Aurelio Díaz (born c. 1950) is a militant in the Workers' Party (Argentina) (PO) and a construction worker.

He was elected to the Chaco Province Assembly in the provincial capital of Resistencia, Chaco in July 2017, when the PO won 6% of the vote across the province, and 11% in Resistencia.

On 24 July 2017 he gave an interview where he was discovering some facts from his biography. The interview was taken soon after his being elected as a deputy from local branch of the Workers' Party (Argentina) and the Left front.

== Early life ==
Aurelio was born on 3 August 1950 in Villa Berthet. His full name is Aurelio Heriberto Díaz. He was a first child in his family and he had to do all the domestic work the likes of chopping the wood, feeding the animals, getting up at 5 am to start the fire and so on. His father was a forester.

== His formation as a politician ==
When he was a child his friend Curi gave him a book Bases and Points of Departure for the National Reorganization of the Country by Alberdi and he read it. Later his uncle Bandeo who was a vice governor in the days of Duca sent his family in Plaza and gave him a book of cooperativeness to be read. When his family lived in Pinedo there was a propaganda of his great uncle Bandeo where he met a word communism for the first time and it called his attention. Then his brother showed him a book which was written by Lenin. That is how the idea of socialism came to him. And he began being involved in political life. At the age of 16 when he was a militant, it happened to be during the last period of Onganía dictatorship.

Being a young man he participated in "la Federación Juvenil Comunista" (the Communist Youth Federation). He was also greatly influenced by The Cuban Revolution, by the Vietnamese who were fighting against USA army and by the events in Cordobazo in 1969. It was during that time that he started to perceive military with much conviction. And later came the study of Marxism.

== Personal life ==
His family consists of 6 members as he and his wife have four children: two girls and two boys. His eldest child is a dentist, another one is a lawyer, one more is a doctor with specialization on nephrology and the youngest is a professor. And his wife is a teacher.
