= San Lorenzo Department, Chaco =

San Lorenzo Department
- Department
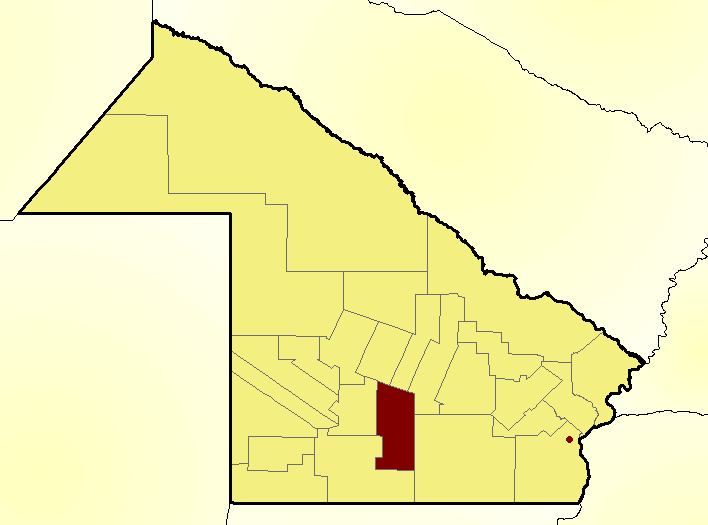
- Location of San Lorenzo Department within Chaco Province
- Coordinates: 27°17′S 60°25′W
- Country: Argentina
- Province: Chaco Province
- Head town: Villa Berthet

Area
  - Total: 2,135 km^{2} (824 sq mi)

Population
  - Total: 14,252
  - Density: 6.675/km^{2} (17.29/sq mi)
- Demonym: Sanlorenzense
- Time zone: UTC-3 (ART)
- Postal code: H3545
- Area code: 03735

San Lorenzo is a department of Chaco Province in Argentina.

The provincial subdivision has a population of about 14,000 inhabitants in an area of 2,135 km^{2} (824 sq mi), and its capital city is Villa Berthet, which is located around 1,190 km (740 mi) from the Capital federal.

== Settlements ==
- Colonia Pozo Colorado
- Samuhú
- Villa Berthet

== See also ==
- Federal Capital
