= Villa Berthet =

- Town
- Location in Argentina
- Coordinates: 27°16′S 60°25′W
- Country: Argentina
- Province: (Chaco Province) Chaco
- Department: San Lorenzo
- 2nd level Municipality: Villa Berthet
- Founded: 1929
- Elevation: 78 m (256 ft)

Population ((2001 census [INDEC]))
  - Total: 12,029
- Time zone: UTC−3 (ART)
- CPA Base: H 3545
- Area code: +54 3735
- Climate: Cfa

Villa Berthet is a town in Chaco Province, Argentina. It is the head town of the San Lorenzo Department.
