= Climate of Uruguay =

Köppen climate classification map for Uruguay

Almost all of Uruguay has a humid subtropical climate (Cfa according to the Köppen climate classification). It is fairly uniform nationwide, since the country is located entirely within the temperate zone. Seasonal variations do exist, but extremes in temperature are rare. As would be expected by its abundance of water, high humidity and fog are common. The absence of mountains and other weather barriers makes all locations vulnerable to high winds and rapid changes in weather as fronts or storms sweep across the country.

The country could possibly get warmer and wetter with climate change, with some parts of the country becoming more tropical, with more extreme rain events. But that is unlikely.

== Temperature and rainfall ==
Seasons are fairly well defined, and in most of Uruguay spring is usually damp, cool, and windy; summers are warm; autumns are mild; and winters are chilly and uncomfortably damp. Northwestern Uruguay, however, is farther from large bodies of water and therefore has warmer summers and milder and drier winters than the rest of the country. Average highs and lows in summer (January) in Montevideo are 28 and 17 °C (82.4 and 62.6 °F), respectively, with an absolute maximum of 43 °C (109.4 °F); comparable numbers for Artigas in the northwest are 33 and 18 °C (91.4 and 64.4 °F), with the highest temperature ever recorded (42 °C or 107.6 °F). Winter (July) average highs and lows in Montevideo are 14 and 6 °C (57.2 and 42.8 °F), respectively, although the high humidity makes the temperatures feel colder; the lowest temperature registered in Montevideo is −5 °C (23.0 °F). Averages in July of a high of 18 °C (64.4 °F) and a low of 7 °C (44.6 °F) in Artigas confirm the milder winters in northwestern Uruguay, but even here temperatures have dropped to a subfreezing −4 °C (24.8 °F).

Rainfall is fairly evenly distributed throughout the year, and annual amounts increase from southeast to northwest. Montevideo averages 950 millimeters (37.4 in) annually, and Artigas receives 1,235 millimeters (48.6 in) in an average year. As in most temperate climates, rainfall results from the passage of cold fronts in winter, falling in overcast drizzly spells, and summer thunderstorms are frequent.

=== Climate data ===
Climate data for Montevideo
Month	Jan	Feb	Mar	Apr	May	Jun	Jul	Aug	Sep	Oct	Nov	Dec	Year
Record high °C (°F)	42.8 (109.0)	40.3 (104.5)	38.4 (101.1)	36.7 (98.1)	32.0 (89.6)	27.4 (81.3)	29.8 (85.6)	30.8 (87.4)	32.0 (89.6)	35.8 (96.4)	38.2 (100.8)	40.8 (105.4)	42.8 (109.0)
Mean daily maximum °C (°F)	27.7 (81.9)	26.8 (80.2)	25.3 (77.5)	21.7 (71.1)	18.2 (64.8)	15.2 (59.4)	14.5 (58.1)	16.3 (61.3)	17.5 (63.5)	20.8 (69.4)	23.3 (73.9)	26.0 (78.8)	21.1 (70.0)
Daily mean °C (°F)	23.2 (73.8)	22.7 (72.9)	21.3 (70.3)	17.9 (64.2)	14.5 (58.1)	11.7 (53.1)	11.1 (52.0)	12.4 (54.3)	13.7 (56.7)	16.6 (61.9)	19.0 (66.2)	21.5 (70.7)	17.1 (62.8)
Mean daily minimum °C (°F)	18.8 (65.8)	18.7 (65.7)	17.3 (63.1)	14.1 (57.4)	10.9 (51.6)	8.3 (46.9)	7.6 (45.7)	8.5 (47.3)	9.9 (49.8)	12.5 (54.5)	14.7 (58.5)	17.0 (62.6)	13.2 (55.8)
Record low °C (°F)	6.0 (42.8)	6.8 (44.2)	3.8 (38.8)	1.3 (34.3)	−2.0 (28.4)	−5.6 (21.9)	−5.0 (23.0)	−3.8 (25.2)	−2.4 (27.7)	−1.5 (29.3)	2.5 (36.5)	5.0 (41.0)	−5.6 (21.9)
Average precipitation mm (inches)	86.8 (3.42)	101.5 (4.00)	104.6 (4.12)	85.5 (3.37)	89.0 (3.50)	83.1 (3.27)	86.4 (3.40)	88.2 (3.47)	93.9 (3.70)	108.5 (4.27)	89.3 (3.52)	84.4 (3.32)	1,101.2 (43.35)
Average precipitation days (≥ 1.0 mm)	6	7	6	6	6	7	7	6	6	7	7	6	77
Average relative humidity (%)	70	73	76	77	79	81	80	78	76	74	72	70	76
Mean monthly sunshine hours	294.5	234.5	220.1	162.0	161.2	126.0	142.6	164.3	180.0	226.3	249.0	282.1	2,442.6
Mean daily sunshine hours	9.5	8.3	7.1	5.4	5.2	4.2	4.6	5.3	6.0	7.3	8.3	9.1	6.7
Source 1: Instituto Nacional de Investigación Agropecuaria
Source 2: Dirección Nacional de Meteorología (precipitation 1961–1990, extremes 1901–1994), World Meteorological Organization (precipitation data 1961–1990)

Climate data for Paysandú
Month	Jan	Feb	Mar	Apr	May	Jun	Jul	Aug	Sep	Oct	Nov	Dec	Year
Record high °C (°F)	44.0 (111.2)	42.4 (108.3)	39.4 (102.9)	36.0 (96.8)	33.0 (91.4)	29.2 (84.6)	30.6 (87.1)	32.8 (91.0)	36.4 (97.5)	38.0 (100.4)	41.5 (106.7)	41.9 (107.4)	44.0 (111.2)
Mean daily maximum °C (°F)	32.0 (89.6)	30.1 (86.2)	28.5 (83.3)	24.1 (75.4)	20.2 (68.4)	17.1 (62.8)	17.0 (62.6)	19.2 (66.6)	20.7 (69.3)	24.1 (75.4)	27.0 (80.6)	30.0 (86.0)	24.2 (75.6)
Daily mean °C (°F)	25.2 (77.4)	24.0 (75.2)	22.6 (72.7)	18.7 (65.7)	15.1 (59.2)	12.4 (54.3)	11.9 (53.4)	13.6 (56.5)	15.0 (59.0)	18.2 (64.8)	20.8 (69.4)	23.4 (74.1)	18.4 (65.1)
Mean daily minimum °C (°F)	18.4 (65.1)	17.8 (64.0)	16.6 (61.9)	13.4 (56.1)	10.1 (50.2)	7.6 (45.7)	6.9 (44.4)	8.1 (46.6)	9.3 (48.7)	12.3 (54.1)	14.5 (58.1)	16.8 (62.2)	12.6 (54.7)
Record low °C (°F)	7.8 (46.0)	3.2 (37.8)	3.2 (37.8)	0.0 (32.0)	−2.6 (27.3)	−7.4 (18.7)	−6.6 (20.1)	−4.0 (24.8)	−3.4 (25.9)	0.6 (33.1)	2.3 (36.1)	4.8 (40.6)	−7.4 (18.7)
Average precipitation mm (inches)	106.1 (4.18)	125.5 (4.94)	137.8 (5.43)	158.8 (6.25)	102.0 (4.02)	68.3 (2.69)	56.1 (2.21)	55.3 (2.18)	71.5 (2.81)	121.3 (4.78)	123.1 (4.85)	112.9 (4.44)	1,238.6 (48.76)
Average precipitation days (≥ 1.0 mm)	6	6	7	6	6	5	6	5	6	7	6	6	72
Average relative humidity (%)	62	67	70	75	77	78	74	72	71	70	67	63	71
Mean monthly sunshine hours	285.2	226.0	232.5	198.0	186.0	153.0	173.6	192.2	201.0	229.4	255.0	279.0	2,610.9
Mean daily sunshine hours	9.2	8.0	7.5	6.6	6.0	5.1	5.6	6.2	6.7	7.4	8.5	9.0	7.2
Source 1: Instituto Nacional de Investigación Agropecuaria
Source 2: Dirección Nacional de Meteorología (precipitation days 1961–1990, extremes 1937–1994)

Climate data for Salto
Month	Jan	Feb	Mar	Apr	May	Jun	Jul	Aug	Sep	Oct	Nov	Dec	Year
Record high °C (°F)	42.2 (108.0)	41.6 (106.9)	40.0 (104.0)	37.0 (98.6)	31.8 (89.2)	29.0 (84.2)	31.6 (88.9)	33.5 (92.3)	35.5 (95.9)	37.8 (100.0)	39.0 (102.2)	41.0 (105.8)	42.2 (108.0)
Mean daily maximum °C (°F)	32.8 (91.0)	31.0 (87.8)	29.3 (84.7)	24.9 (76.8)	21.1 (70.0)	18.2 (64.8)	18.1 (64.6)	20.5 (68.9)	22.0 (71.6)	25.3 (77.5)	28.2 (82.8)	31.1 (88.0)	25.2 (77.4)
Daily mean °C (°F)	26.2 (79.2)	25.0 (77.0)	23.4 (74.1)	19.5 (67.1)	15.9 (60.6)	13.3 (55.9)	12.8 (55.0)	14.6 (58.3)	16.0 (60.8)	19.4 (66.9)	21.8 (71.2)	24.5 (76.1)	19.4 (66.9)
Mean daily minimum °C (°F)	19.7 (67.5)	18.9 (66.0)	17.4 (63.3)	14.0 (57.2)	10.6 (51.1)	8.4 (47.1)	7.6 (45.7)	8.7 (47.7)	10.0 (50.0)	13.4 (56.1)	15.5 (59.9)	17.9 (64.2)	13.5 (56.3)
Record low °C (°F)	8.3 (46.9)	7.0 (44.6)	4.4 (39.9)	1.5 (34.7)	−2.0 (28.4)	−5.3 (22.5)	−4.8 (23.4)	−3.3 (26.1)	−3.0 (26.6)	0.8 (33.4)	4.0 (39.2)	5.4 (41.7)	−5.3 (22.5)
Average precipitation mm (inches)	118.2 (4.65)	129.6 (5.10)	157.7 (6.21)	162.2 (6.39)	95.8 (3.77)	76.0 (2.99)	53.1 (2.09)	58.7 (2.31)	86.6 (3.41)	134.2 (5.28)	141.8 (5.58)	125.3 (4.93)	1,399.2 (55.09)
Average precipitation days (≥ 1.0 mm)	5	6	5	5	5	5	4	4	5	6	5	5	60
Average relative humidity (%)	62	67	70	75	78	80	76	72	69	69	65	62	71
Mean monthly sunshine hours	313.1	262.7	266.6	213.0	198.4	153.0	182.9	204.6	213.0	254.2	282.0	303.8	2,847.3
Mean daily sunshine hours	10.1	9.3	8.6	7.1	6.4	5.1	5.9	6.6	7.1	8.2	9.4	9.8	7.8
Source 1: Instituto Nacional de Investigación Agropecuaria
Source 2: Dirección Nacional de Meteorología (precipitation days 1961–1990, extremes 1942–1994)

Climate data for Artigas
Month	Jan	Feb	Mar	Apr	May	Jun	Jul	Aug	Sep	Oct	Nov	Dec	Year
Record high °C (°F)	40.9 (105.6)	41.2 (106.2)	40.8 (105.4)	36.0 (96.8)	31.7 (89.1)	29.5 (85.1)	29.7 (85.5)	34.4 (93.9)	36.0 (96.8)	36.7 (98.1)	40.8 (105.4)	41.4 (106.5)	41.4 (106.5)
Mean daily maximum °C (°F)	32.3 (90.1)	30.6 (87.1)	29.1 (84.4)	25.0 (77.0)	21.3 (70.3)	18.6 (65.5)	18.4 (65.1)	20.9 (69.6)	21.9 (71.4)	25.2 (77.4)	27.9 (82.2)	30.9 (87.6)	25.2 (77.4)
Daily mean °C (°F)	25.9 (78.6)	24.8 (76.6)	23.4 (74.1)	19.7 (67.5)	16.0 (60.8)	13.7 (56.7)	13.3 (55.9)	15.2 (59.4)	16.3 (61.3)	19.4 (66.9)	21.7 (71.1)	24.4 (75.9)	19.5 (67.1)
Mean daily minimum °C (°F)	19.5 (67.1)	19.0 (66.2)	17.7 (63.9)	14.4 (57.9)	10.7 (51.3)	8.8 (47.8)	8.2 (46.8)	9.4 (48.9)	10.6 (51.1)	13.7 (56.7)	15.5 (59.9)	17.8 (64.0)	13.8 (56.8)
Record low °C (°F)	8.2 (46.8)	7.9 (46.2)	6.3 (43.3)	2.0 (35.6)	−3.0 (26.6)	−4.6 (23.7)	−5.2 (22.6)	−4.3 (24.3)	−1.0 (30.2)	1.2 (34.2)	3.4 (38.1)	6.0 (42.8)	−5.2 (22.6)
Average precipitation mm (inches)	130.9 (5.15)	155.2 (6.11)	145.0 (5.71)	173.1 (6.81)	130.4 (5.13)	97.8 (3.85)	77.2 (3.04)	71.3 (2.81)	113.2 (4.46)	142.7 (5.62)	153.7 (6.05)	126.3 (4.97)	1,516.7 (59.71)
Average precipitation days (≥ 1.0 mm)	5	6	6	6	5	5	6	5	6	5	6	5	66
Average relative humidity (%)	61	68	70	72	77	79	75	70	69	69	65	61	70
Mean monthly sunshine hours	279.0	228.8	235.6	183.0	179.8	144.0	170.5	195.3	195.0	226.3	255.0	279.0	2,571.3
Mean daily sunshine hours	9.0	8.1	7.6	6.1	5.8	4.8	5.5	6.3	6.5	7.3	8.5	9.0	7.0
Source 1: Instituto Nacional de Investigación Agropecuaria
Source 2: Dirección Nacional de Meteorología (precipitation days 1961–1990, extremes 1944–1994)

Climate data for Melo
Month	Jan	Feb	Mar	Apr	May	Jun	Jul	Aug	Sep	Oct	Nov	Dec	Year
Record high °C (°F)	43.0 (109.4)	40.5 (104.9)	40.4 (104.7)	38.0 (100.4)	32.3 (90.1)	30.2 (86.4)	30.0 (86.0)	32.0 (89.6)	37.0 (98.6)	37.0 (98.6)	38.4 (101.1)	45.0 (113.0)	45.0 (113.0)
Mean daily maximum °C (°F)	30.2 (86.4)	29.2 (84.6)	27.8 (82.0)	24.1 (75.4)	20.2 (68.4)	17.2 (63.0)	16.8 (62.2)	18.7 (65.7)	20.0 (68.0)	23.1 (73.6)	25.8 (78.4)	28.6 (83.5)	23.5 (74.3)
Daily mean °C (°F)	23.9 (75.0)	23.3 (73.9)	21.9 (71.4)	18.5 (65.3)	14.8 (58.6)	12.2 (54.0)	11.8 (53.2)	13.3 (55.9)	14.5 (58.1)	17.4 (63.3)	19.8 (67.6)	22.2 (72.0)	17.8 (64.0)
Mean daily minimum °C (°F)	17.7 (63.9)	17.5 (63.5)	16.0 (60.8)	12.9 (55.2)	9.4 (48.9)	7.2 (45.0)	6.7 (44.1)	7.9 (46.2)	9.0 (48.2)	11.8 (53.2)	13.8 (56.8)	15.8 (60.4)	12.1 (53.8)
Record low °C (°F)	1.0 (33.8)	3.6 (38.5)	0.0 (32.0)	−5.2 (22.6)	−5.9 (21.4)	−11.0 (12.2)	−9.6 (14.7)	−4.8 (23.4)	−4.0 (24.8)	−3.0 (26.6)	1.2 (34.2)	4.0 (39.2)	−11.0 (12.2)
Average precipitation mm (inches)	106.1 (4.18)	126.9 (5.00)	112.6 (4.43)	137.6 (5.42)	136.7 (5.38)	117.0 (4.61)	107.9 (4.25)	105.2 (4.14)	117.1 (4.61)	122.9 (4.84)	121.8 (4.80)	99.6 (3.92)	1,411.3 (55.56)
Average precipitation days (≥ 1.0 mm)	5	6	5	5	5	6	6	5	6	6	5	4	65
Average relative humidity (%)	69	72	74	76	79	81	79	77	75	74	71	69	75
Mean monthly sunshine hours	269.7	223.2	223.2	189.0	176.7	138.0	155.0	176.7	183.0	220.1	243.0	275.9	2,473.5
Mean daily sunshine hours	8.7	7.9	7.2	6.3	5.7	4.6	5.0	5.7	6.1	7.1	8.1	8.9	6.8
Source 1: Instituto Nacional de Investigación Agropecuaria
Source 2: Dirección Nacional de Meteorología (precipitation days 1961–1990, extremes 1937–1994)

== Winds ==
High winds are a disagreeable characteristic of the weather, particularly during the winter and spring, and wind shifts are sudden and pronounced. A winter warm spell can be abruptly broken by a strong pampero, a chilly and occasionally violent wind blowing north from the Argentine pampas. Summer winds off the ocean, however, have the salutary effect of tempering warm daytime temperatures.

Occasionally, damaging extratropical cyclones occur:

- In 2005, a heavy storm affected southern Uruguay with winds of up to 200 km/h.
- In 2012, another similar storm swept the southern coasts with winds of up to 172 km/h.

== Climate change ==
Climate change in Uruguay describes the effects of climate change in Uruguay. As the result of global temperature increases, Uruguay is expected to have temperature increases of 3 °C by about 2100 and there is expected increases in precipitation. Increases of climate rain in Uruguay and Argentina during 2018 was estimated by the World Meteorological organization to have caused $2.5 billion in damage.

The main sources of carbon emissions in Uruguay are food production and transport. When compared to the rest of the world, Uruguay only contributes 0.05% of the total global emissions. In 2017, Uruguay identified 106 methods of reducing emissions as part of their Nationally Determined Contributions to the Paris Climate Agreement. Activities include reductions of emissions across food and grain production, increases of native and reforested land, restoration of bogland and grasslands as carbon sinks. The Nationally Determined Contribution began a process of revision in 2020 with the objective to provide greater ambition in 2022.

To pursue climate policy, the country created on the 20th of May 2009, the Sistema Nacional de Respuesta al Cambio Climático y variabilidad (SNRCC) through directive 238/09. The SNRCC produces reportes from monitoring and verification of the work to achieve the Nationally Determined Contribution and other policies.

In 2015, a law transformed that organization into a Secretariat for Environment, Water and Climate change. The Secretariat is charged with coordinating public policy across the three areas. The secretary participates in the committee of other actors in the National Environmental System (in Spanish, Sistema Nacional Ambiental (SNA)). Internationally, Uruguay is part of the Kyoto Protocol, Paris Accorde and the Doha Amendment. The private sector in Uruguay has committed to at least 15 actions to mitigate the effects of climate change, according to the NAZCA portal. Uruguay is also a member of the International Renewable Energy Agency.

== Institutions ==
The Uruguayan National Directorate of Meteorology (Spanish: Dirección Nacional de Meteorología) is the leading institution in climatological matters. Since 1951 Uruguay is member of the World Meteorological Organization.

As a consequence of the 4th General Meeting of Global Environment Facility in 2010, there will be an observatory specialized in climate change in Uruguay - a new experience on a world scale.
