= July 2007 Argentine winter storm =

Weather event in Argentina

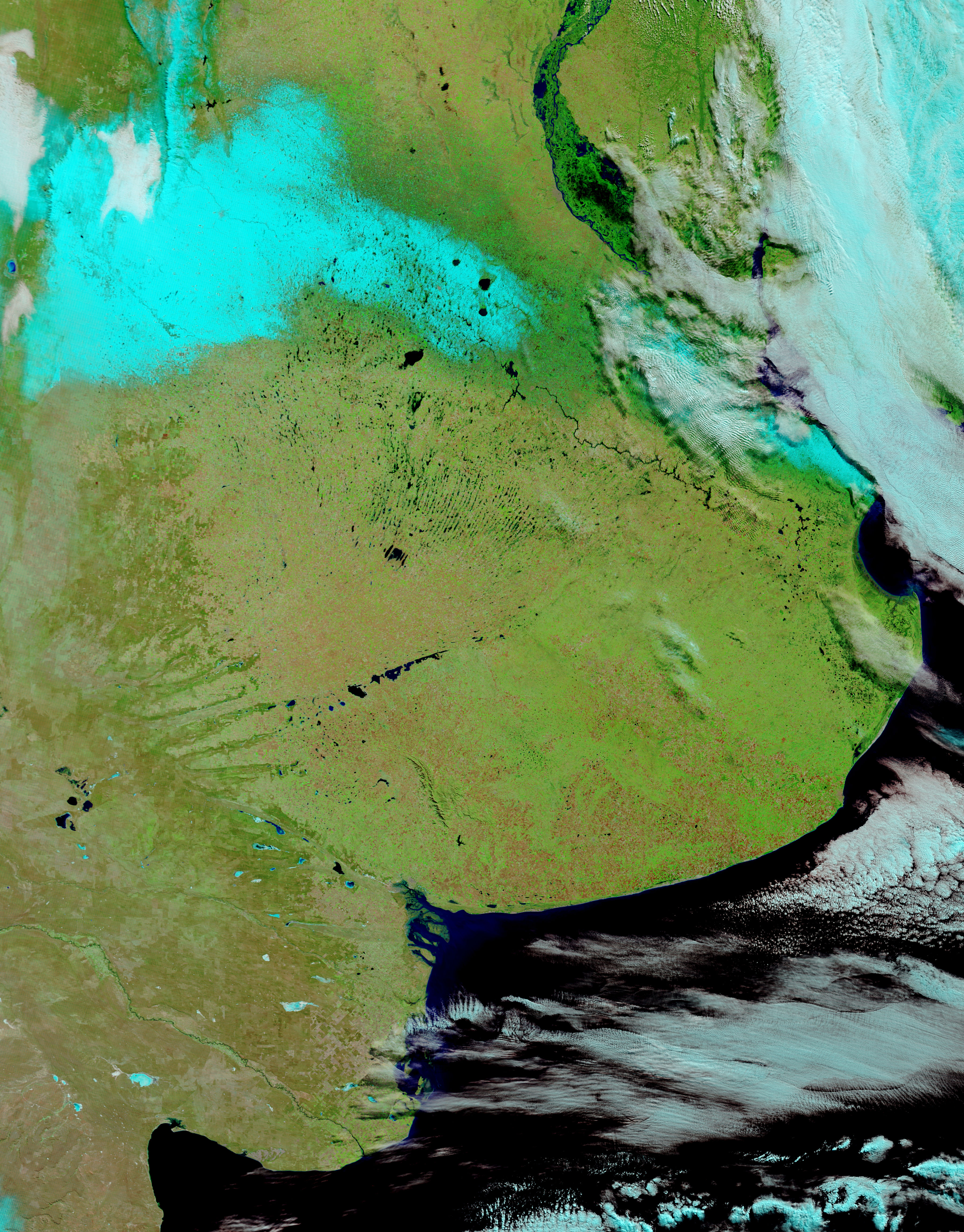
- MODIS image of snowfall (shown in blue) in Central Argentina on July 10, 2007

Meteorological history
- Formed: 6 July 2007

Winter storm
- Lowest temperature: El Moligüe, Río Negro : −32.0 °C (−25.6 °F); Maquinchao, Río Negro : −20.0 °C (−4.0 °F); Chapelco, Neuquén : −19.9 °C (−3.8 °F); Bariloche, Río Negro : −18.8 °C (−1.8 °F); Esquel, Chubut : −15.4 °C (4.3 °F)
- Maximum snowfall or ice accretion: Concorvado, Chubut : 60 centimetres (24 in); Río Cuarto, Córdoba : 30 centimetres (12 in)

Overall effects
- Fatalities: 55
- Areas affected: Southern-Central regions of Argentina

The July 2007 Argentine winter storm resulted from the interaction of an area of low pressure systems across central Argentina and the entry of a massive polar cold snap during the 6–8 July 2007; it was the worst winter of Argentina in almost forty years. Severe snowfalls and blizzards affected the country. In Patagonia, several lakes were frozen. The cold snap advanced from the south towards the central zone of the country during Friday, July 6, continuing its displacement towards the north during Saturday, July 7 and Sunday, July 8. On Monday July 9, the simultaneous presence of very cold air, above the average levels of the atmosphere as in the surface, gave place to the occurrence of snowfalls even in localities where snow is very rare. This phenomenon left at least 46 people dead in Argentina, six in Chile, and 3 in Bolivia.

While heavy snows and blizzards are a common, yearly occurrence in Southern Argentina, the unusually strong 2007 cold snap extended snow cover to areas in Central Argentina where it has been very rarely recorded, such as the capital, Buenos Aires, areas of Santa Fe Province or the northern parts of Córdoba Province. It was the third time that a phenomenon like this happened in the country. The first time was in 1912 and the second one was in 1918, when the most significant volume of snow accumulation on the ground ever registered in Buenos Aires took place. Since 9 July is a national holiday in Argentina, crowds gathered in the streets and parks all over the country to experience snow, many for the first time in their lives.

== Cities affected by snowfalls ==
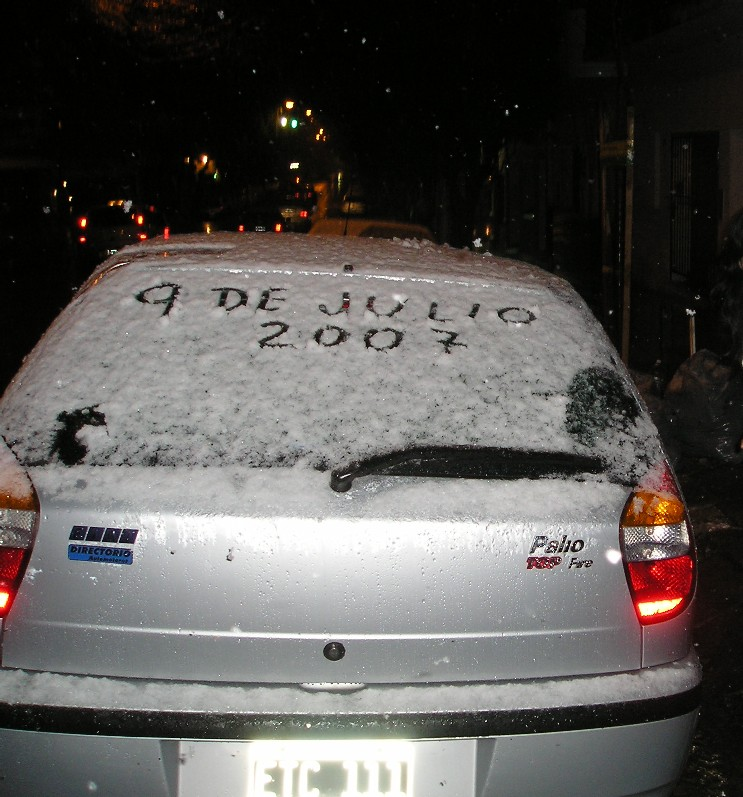
Car covered with snow in Buenos Aires

| City | Province |
| Buenos Aires | Autonomous City of Buenos Aires |
| Bell Ville | Córdoba Province |
| Córdoba | Córdoba Province |
| Villa Dolores | Córdoba Province |
| Rio Cuarto | Córdoba Province |
| Pilar | Cordoba Province |
| Laboulaye | Córdoba Province |
| Mendoza | Mendoza Province |
| San Rafael | Mendoza Province |
| San Luis | San Luis Province |
| Villa Reynolds | San Luis Province |
| Venado Tuerto | Santa Fe Province |
| Santa Rosa | La Pampa Province |
| Junín | Buenos Aires Province |
| Ezeiza | Buenos Aires Province |
| San Fernando | Buenos Aires Province |
| La Plata | Buenos Aires Province |
| Pergamino | Buenos Aires Province |
| San Pedro | Buenos Aires Province |
| Neuquén | Neuquén Province |

During the July 9, 2007, weather radars, monitored this snowfalls and announced the cities that were affected by the blizzard. The coldest temperature plunged to −32 °C (−26 °F) and was registered in the province of Rio Negro.

== Gallery ==
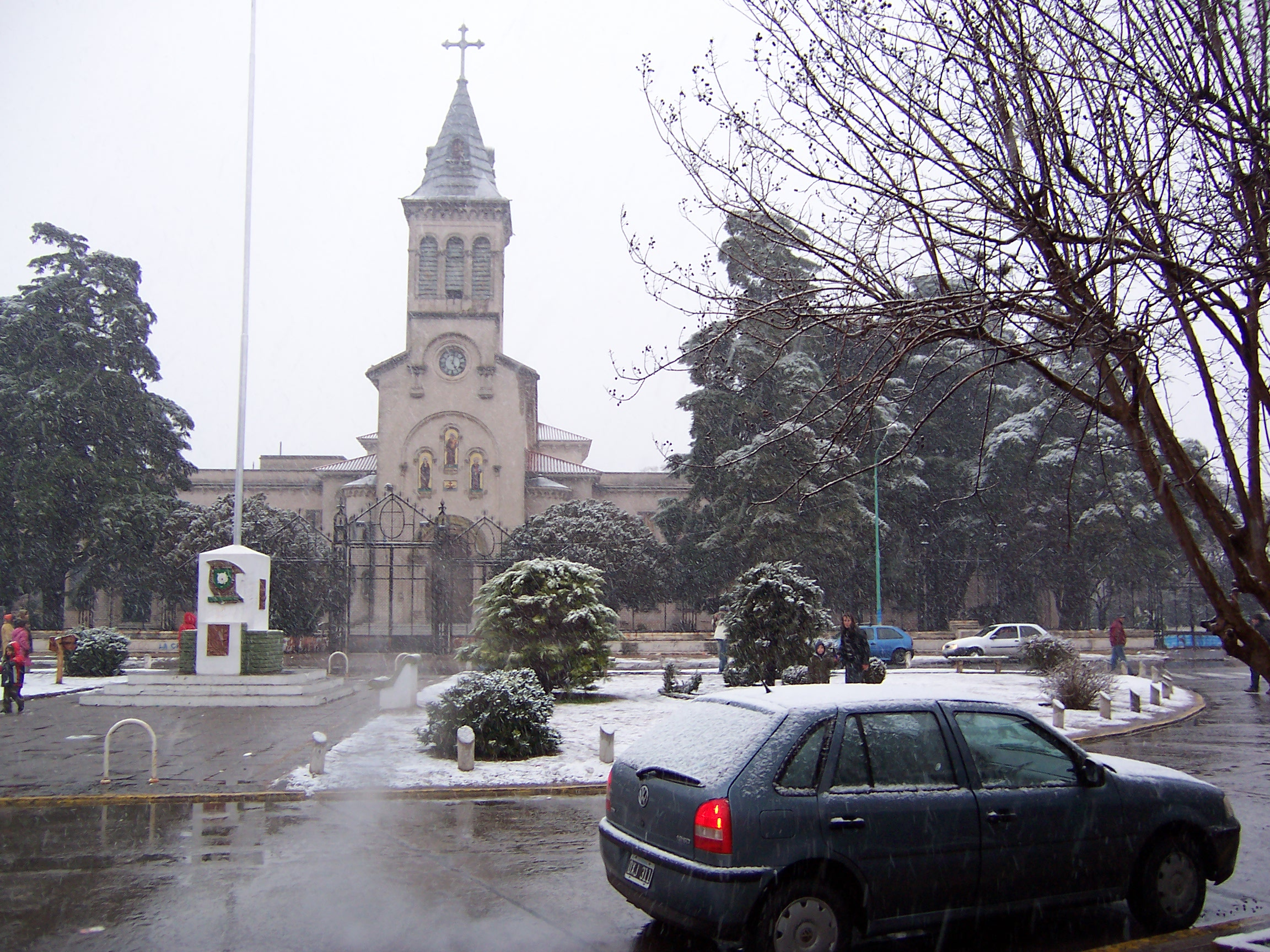
San Antonio de Padua, Buenos Aires province

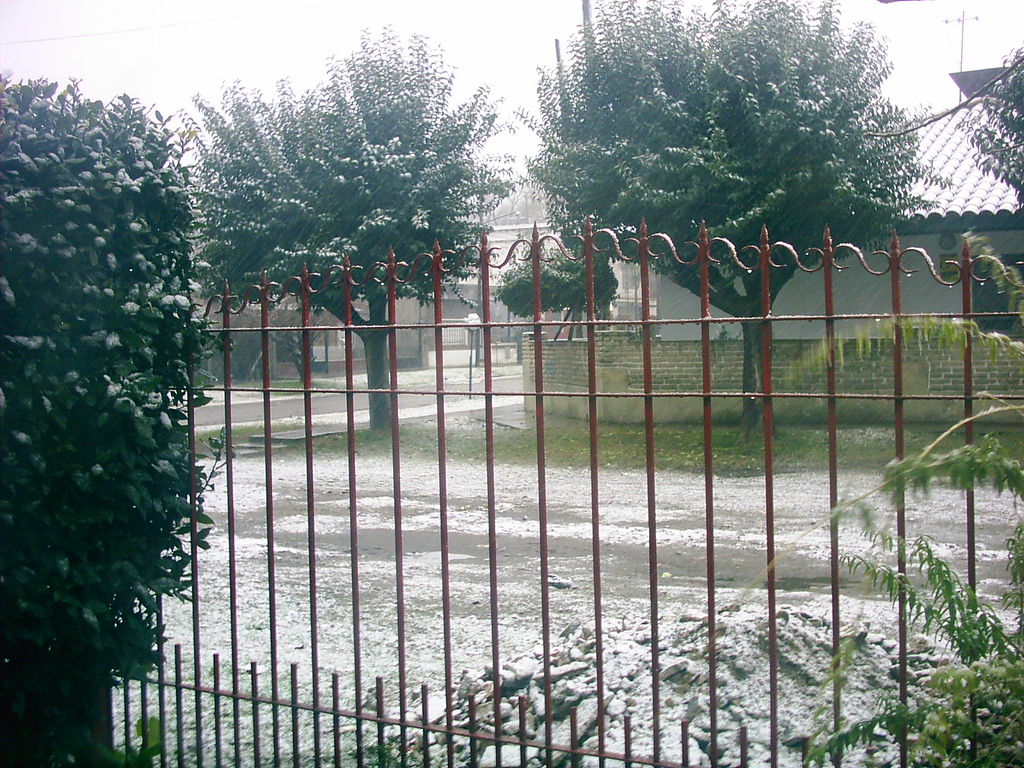
Buenos Aires city

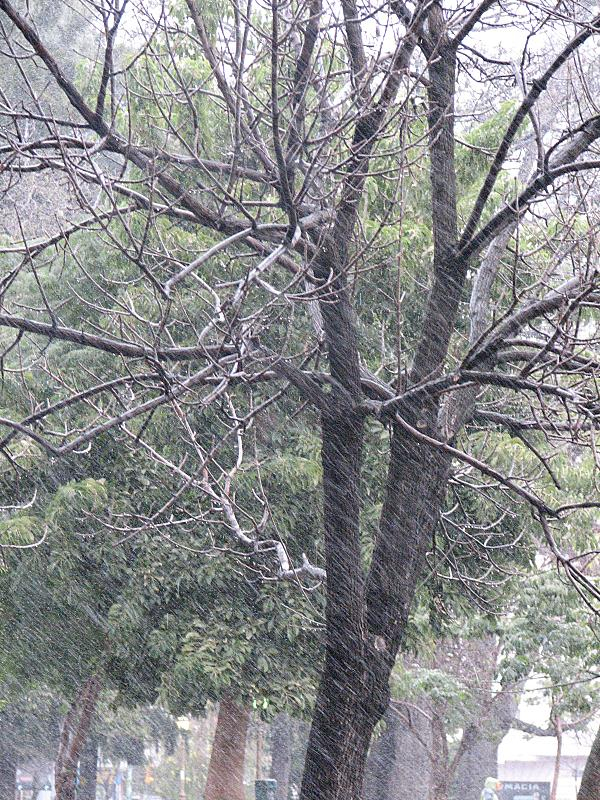
Chacabuco Park, Buenos Aires city

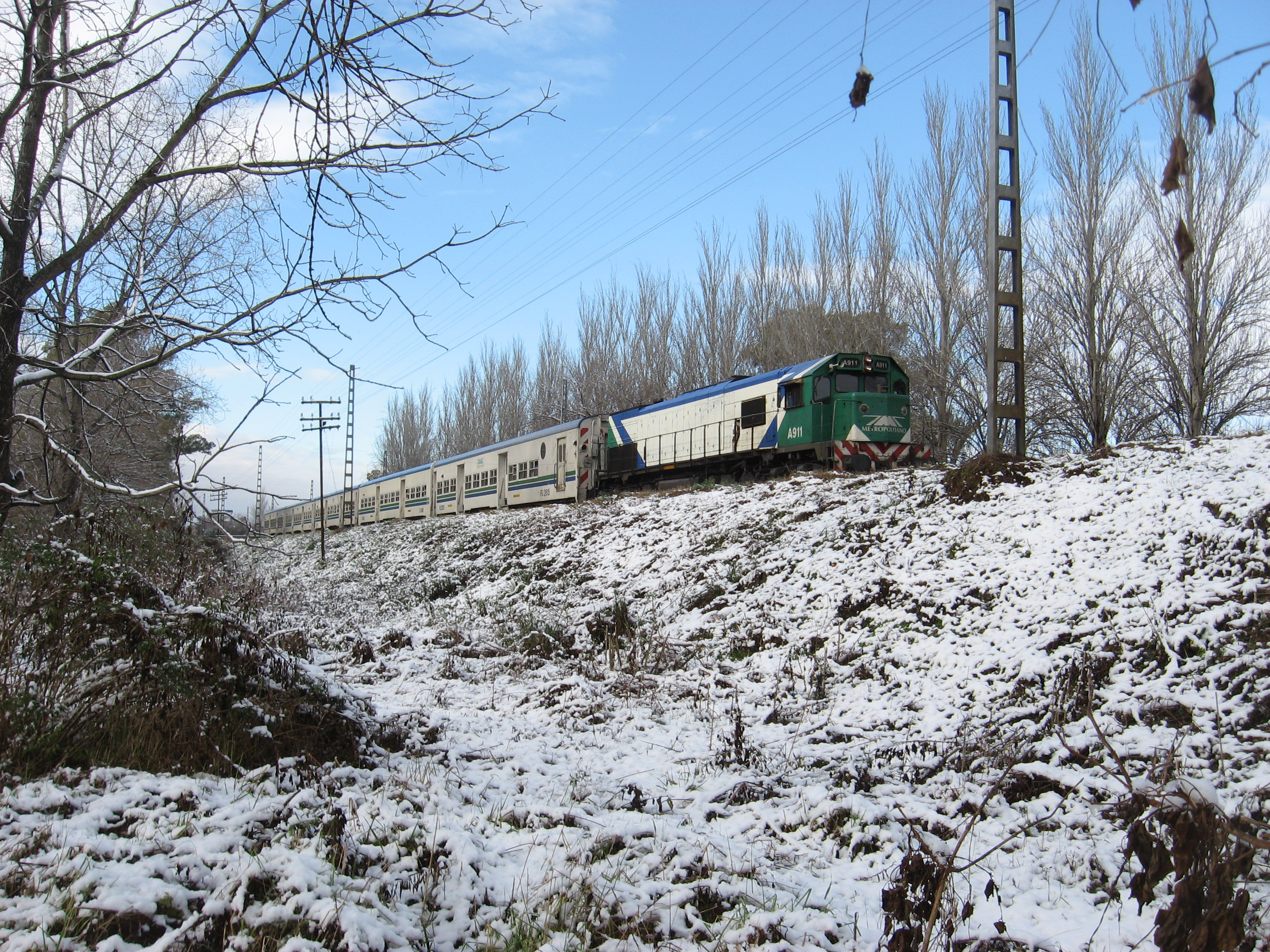
A train formation crosses the snowy landscape between Gonnet and City Bell

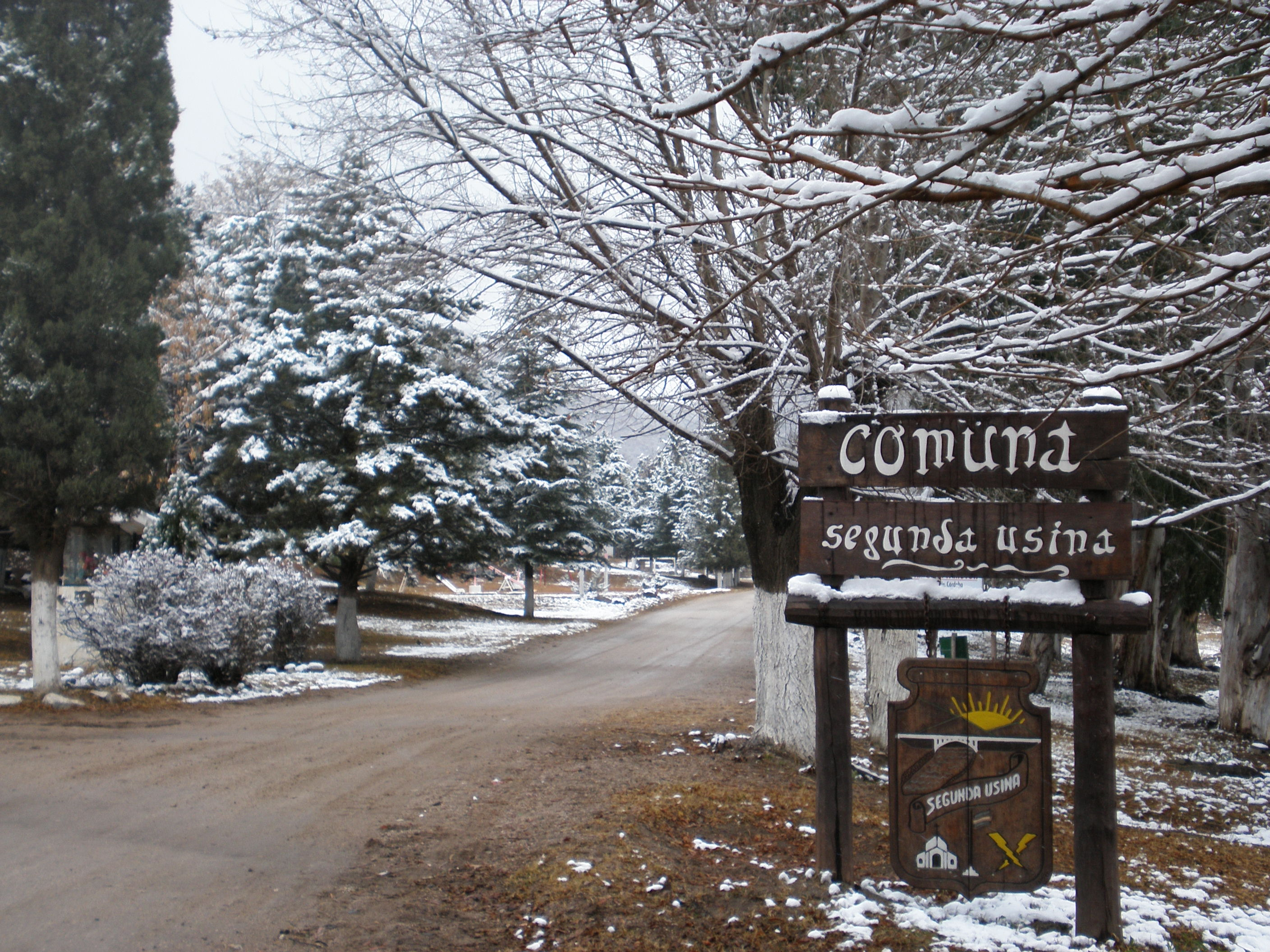
Segunda Usina, Córdoba province

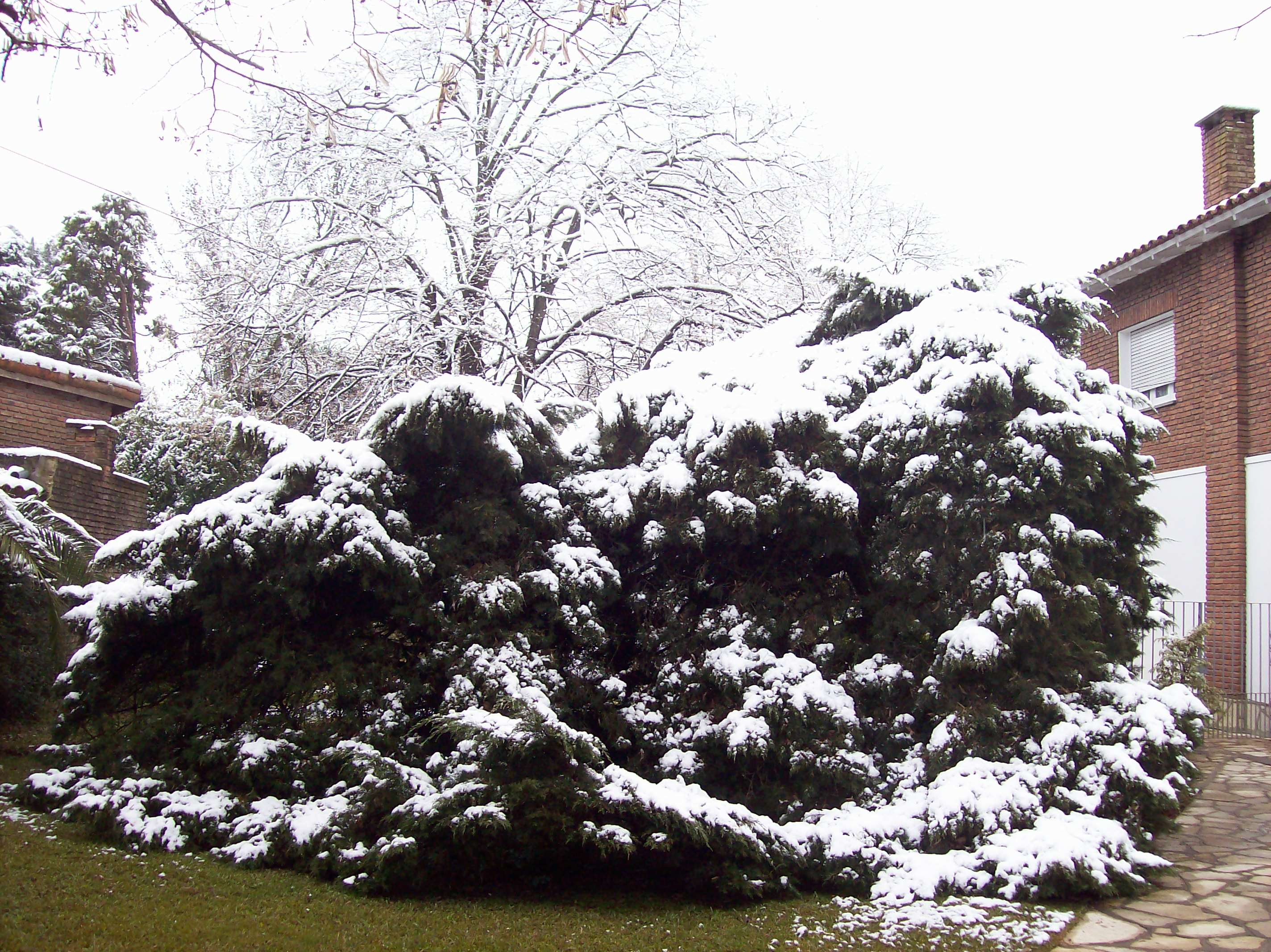
Snow in Ranelagh, Buenos Aires

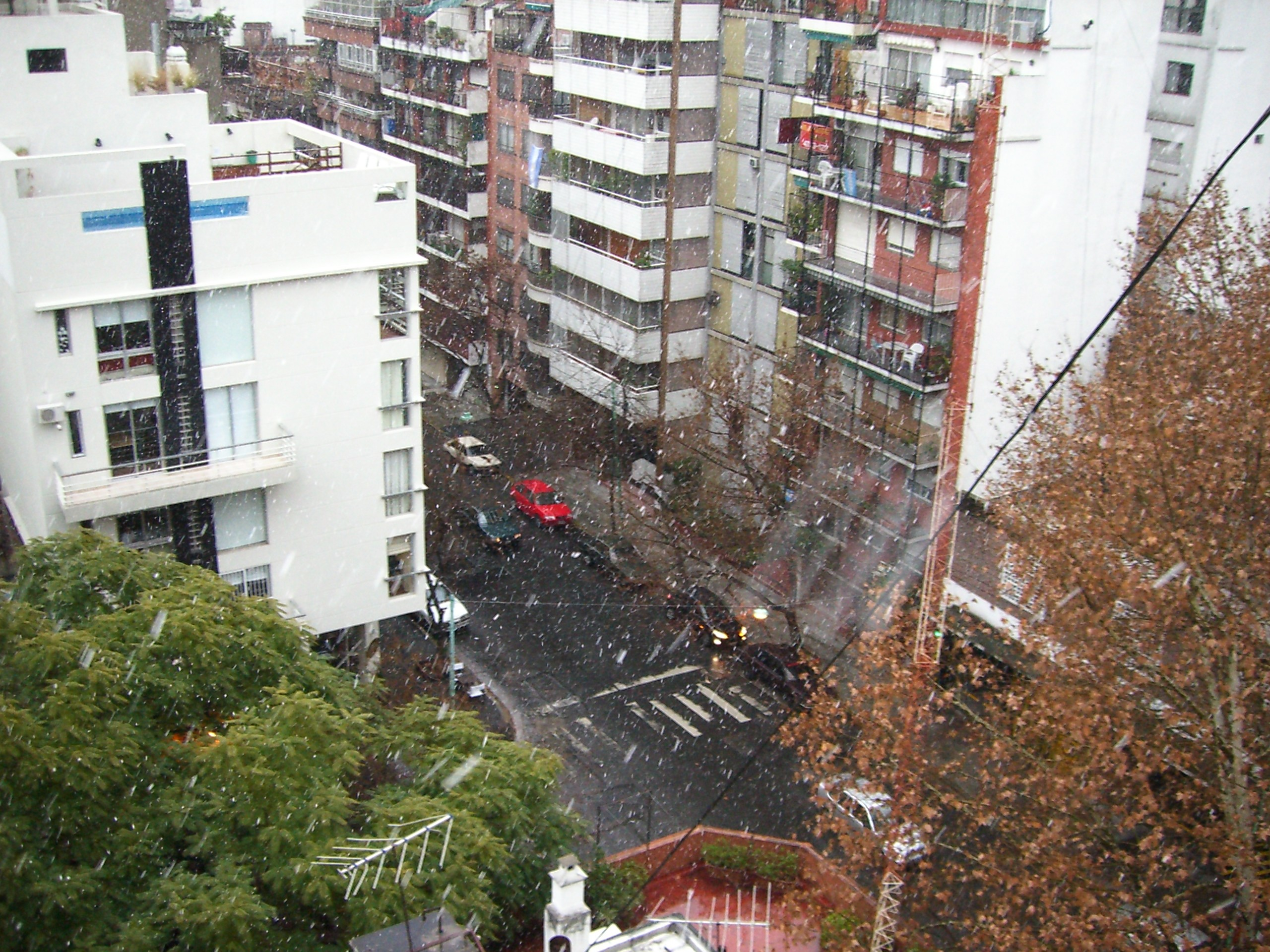
Light snow over a residential Buenos Aires neighborhood

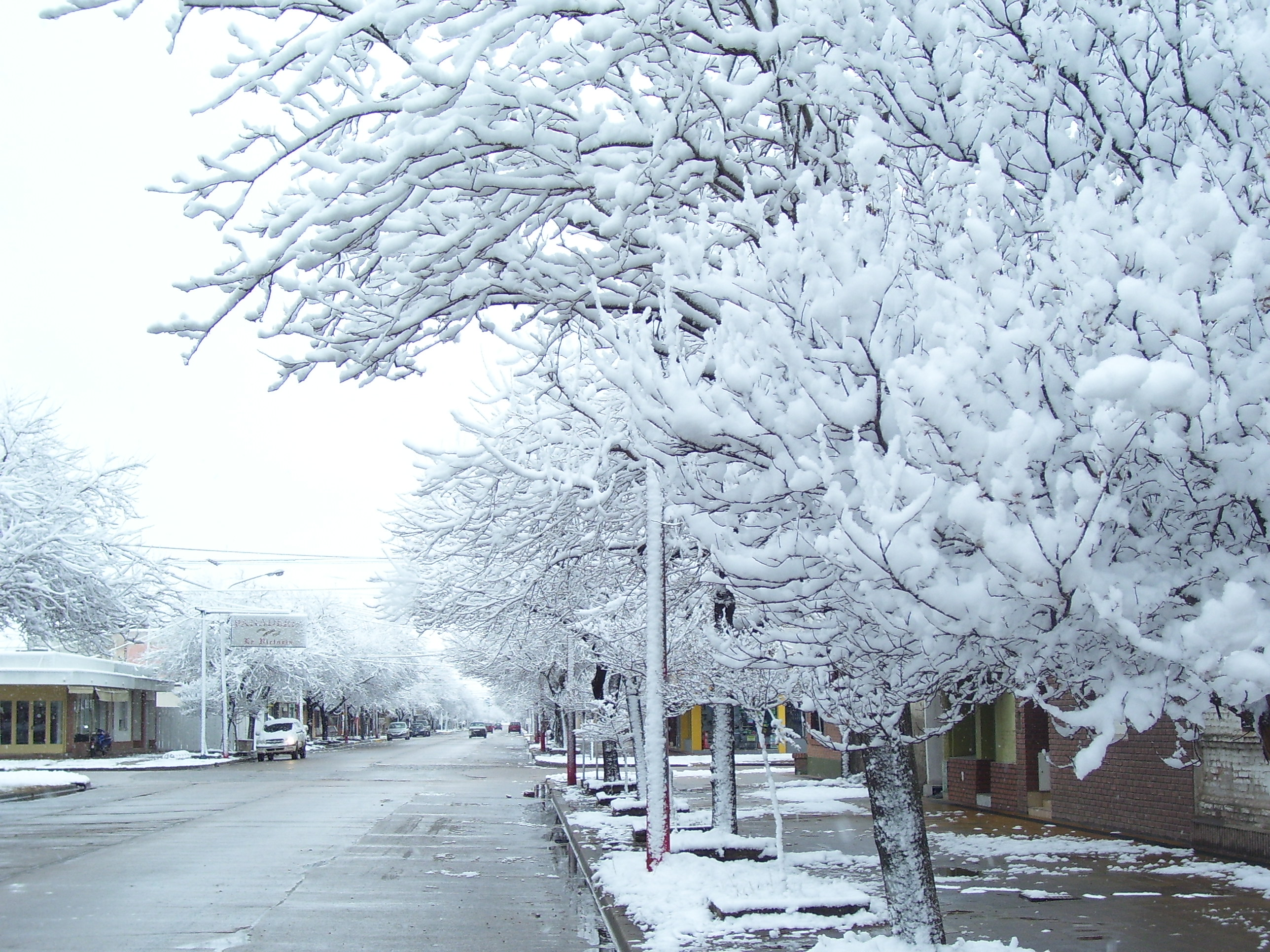
Snowy trees at La Carlota, Córdoba province

== See also ==
- August 2009 Argentine winter heat wave
- Climate of Argentina
- Climate of Buenos Aires
