= Climate of Buenos Aires =

Buenos Aires

Climate chart (precipitation, max. and min. temperature)
J	F	M	A	M	J	J	A	S	O	N	D
134 30 20	129 29 19	120 27 18	130 23 14	94 19 11	62 16 8	74 16 8	70 18 9	81 20 11	123 23 13	118 26 16	123 29 19
- █ Average max. and min. temperatures in °C
- █ Precipitation totals in mm
- Source: Servicio Meteorológico Nacional
Imperial conversion
J	F	M	A	M	J	J	A	S	O	N	D
5.3 86 68	5.1 84 67	4.7 81 64	5.1 74 57	3.7 67 52	2.4 62 47	2.9 60 46	2.8 64 48	3.2 67 51	4.8 73 56	4.6 79 61	4.8 84 65
- █ Average max. and min. temperatures in °F
- █ Precipitation totals in inches

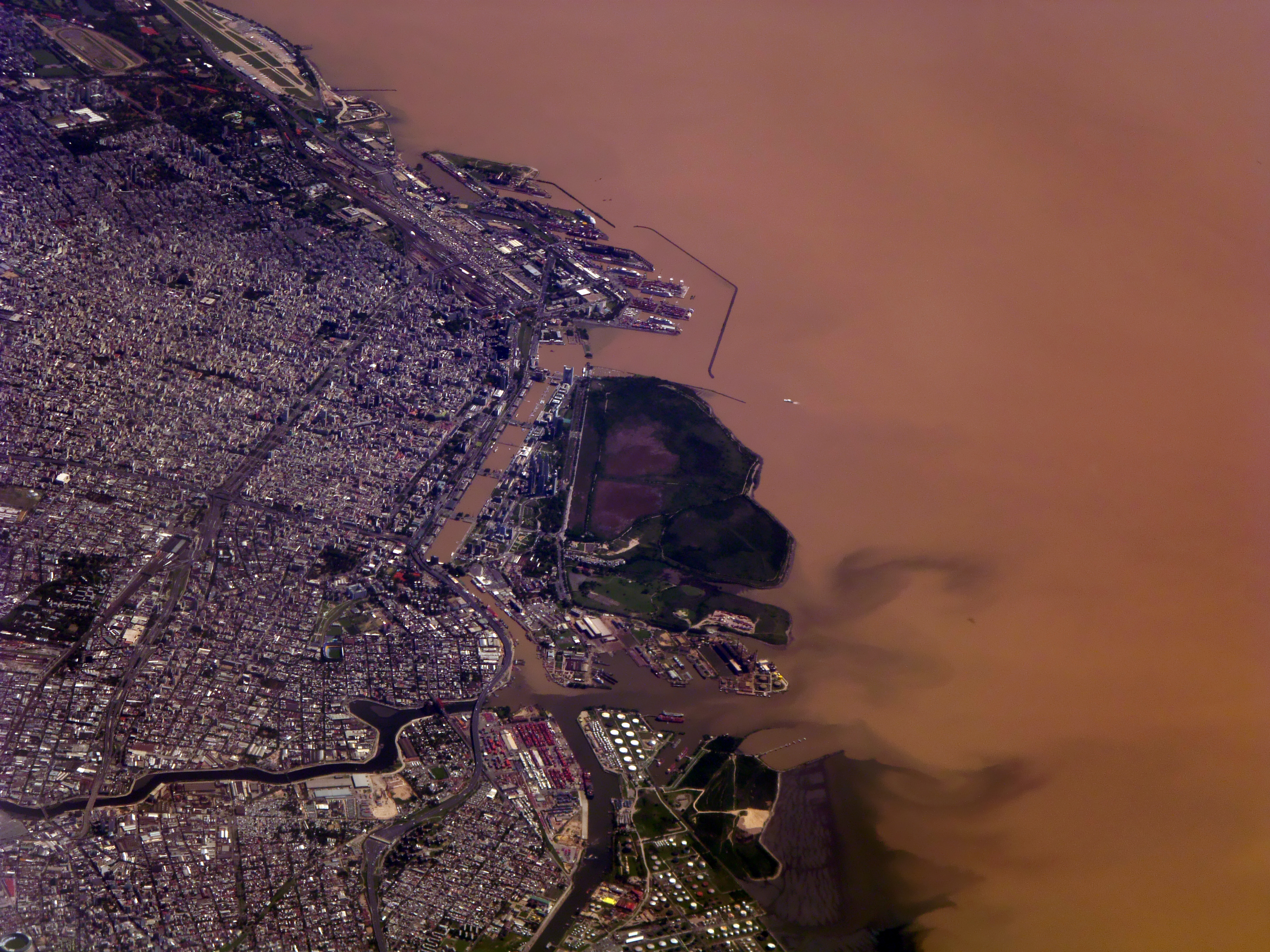
View of central Buenos Aires from the air

Buenos Aires, the capital of Argentina, has a temperate climate, which is classified as a humid subtropical climate (Cfa) under the Köppen climate classification. Summers are hot and humid with frequent thunderstorms while winters are cool and drier with frosts that occur on average twice per year. Spring and fall are transition seasons characterized by changeable weather. At the central observatory, (Note: The central observatory refers to the weather station located in Villa Ortúzar that has been operational since 1906, having one of oldest and most reliable weather records in South America.) the highest temperature recorded is 43.3 °C (109.9 °F), and the lowest temperature recorded is −5.4 °C (22.3 °F).

Different climatic factors influence the climate of Buenos Aires. The semi–permanent South Atlantic High influences its climate throughout the year by bringing in moist winds from the northeast, which bring most of the precipitation to the city in the form of frontal systems during winter or storms produced by cyclogenesis in autumn and winter. The hot temperatures and high insolation in the summer months form a low pressure system called the Chaco Low over northern Argentina, generating a pressure gradient that brings moist easterly winds to the city – because of this, summer is the rainiest season. In contrast, this low pressure system weakens in the winter, which combined with strong southerly winds results in a drier season due to weaker easterly winds. Being located in the Pampas, Buenos Aires has variable weather due to the passage of contrasting air mass – the cold, dry Pampero from the south and warm, humid tropical air from the north. The coastal location results in a strong maritime influence, causing extreme temperatures (hot or cold) to be rare.

== General climatology ==
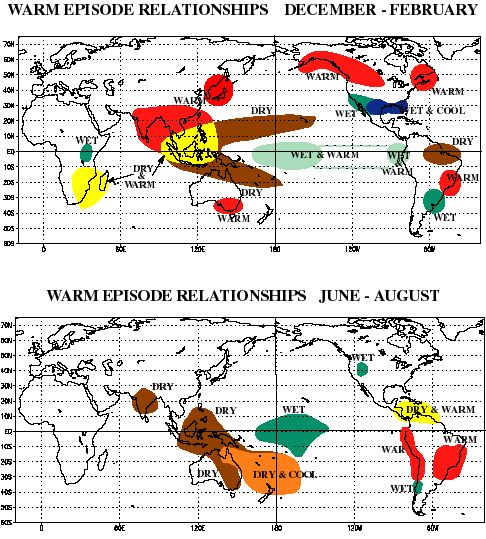
During El Niño years, precipitation in Buenos Aires is higher, particularly during the summer months.

Buenos Aires is located in the humid subtropical climate zone (Köppen climate classification: Cfa). Due to the maritime influences from the adjoining Atlantic Ocean, its climate is temperate with extreme temperatures (both hot and cold) being rare. Thus, cold air coming directly from the south are moderated by the Atlantic Ocean and warmer than winds from the southwest (which are not moderated by it).

The climate of Buenos Aires is dominated by the semi–permanent South Atlantic High throughout the year. This brings in moist winds from the northeast, which brings most of the precipitation to the city. During winter, it brings in frontal systems responsible for precipitation in the city. In autumn and summer, it produces thunderstorms that are generally located north of the city and produces strong winds from the south or southeast that can occasionally lead to the swelling of the Río de la Plata, flooding coastal areas. The South Pacific High is the origin of polar air masses that are responsible for the coldest temperatures and result in clear and very dry conditions. These air masses originate from the South Pacific high and move in a northeastern direction during winter towards Buenos Aires. Although it is polar maritime (this is a cool, moist air mass that forms from oceans located in the sub-Antarctic and Antarctic regions at the southern tip of South America), it becomes modified as it passes over the South American continent, becoming drier as it arrives at Buenos Aires. This is because as the cold air masses from the South Pacific High move over the Pacific Ocean and the Andes and reach the land south of 35^{o}S (where the Andes not as high), anticyclogenesis leads to the formation of a strong high pressure system in the center of the country (at around 40^{o}S). This high pressure system brings cold and dry, polar continental air masses to Buenos Aires. Cold fronts are more common during winter than in summer as the South Atlantic and South Pacific highs are at their southernmost positions during summer, making it difficult for cold fronts to enter.

The city is located in an area in which the Pampero and the Sudestada winds pass by. Being located in the Pampas, the weather is variable due to the contrasting air masses and frontal storms. The Pampero wind brings in cold, dry air from the south while warm humid tropical air produces sultry nortes (a gentle wind usually from the northeast formed by trade winds and the South Atlantic High that brings cloudy, hot, and humid weather and is responsible for bringing heat waves). Often, the passage of the Pampero winds occurs as a cold front passes through, leading to strong gusts from the south or southeast, a decrease in humidity and temperature, and an increase in the atmospheric pressure. When the cold Pampero winds meet with warm humid air from the north, thunderstorms are produced. The Sudestada winds are formed when a high pressure system located in southern Argentina interacts with a low pressure system over Uruguay and southern Brazil. When Sudestadas form, they bring long periods of precipitation, cloudy weather and cooler temperatures. These are common during the winter months. Because the Sudestada brings the highest wind speeds (particularly when these winds are combined with the astronomical tides), the Sudestada is responsible for floods that occur in low-lying areas. Its geomorphology along with inadequate drainage network and infrastructure, a flat landscape, and low elevations (much of Buenos Aires lies between 4 and 24 metres (13 and 79 ft) above sea level) makes Buenos Aires highly vulnerable to flooding, particularly during heavy rainfall. Flooding impacts the neighbourhoods La Boca and Barracas which are in the southern parts of the city, more low-lying and inhabited by poor people (of low socioeconomic status).

The urban heat island makes the city warmer than suburban and rural areas. On average, Buenos Aires is warmer than the surrounding areas by 1.5 to 3.5 °C (2.7 to 6.3 °F) owing to the urban heat island. The average heat island is higher in summer than in winter. This varies by season; its influence during the day is the stronger in July than in January. In contrast, the urban heat island effect during nights is more intense in January than in July.

The El Niño–Southern Oscillation is a major factor in the variation of annual precipitation within Buenos Aires and the Pampas, particularly during spring and summer. During an El Niño year, precipitation is higher, with a significant increase in precipitation from November to January. In contrast, La Niña years are associated with lower precipitation; precipitation is below average during October–December.

== Seasonal weather ==
=== Spring ===
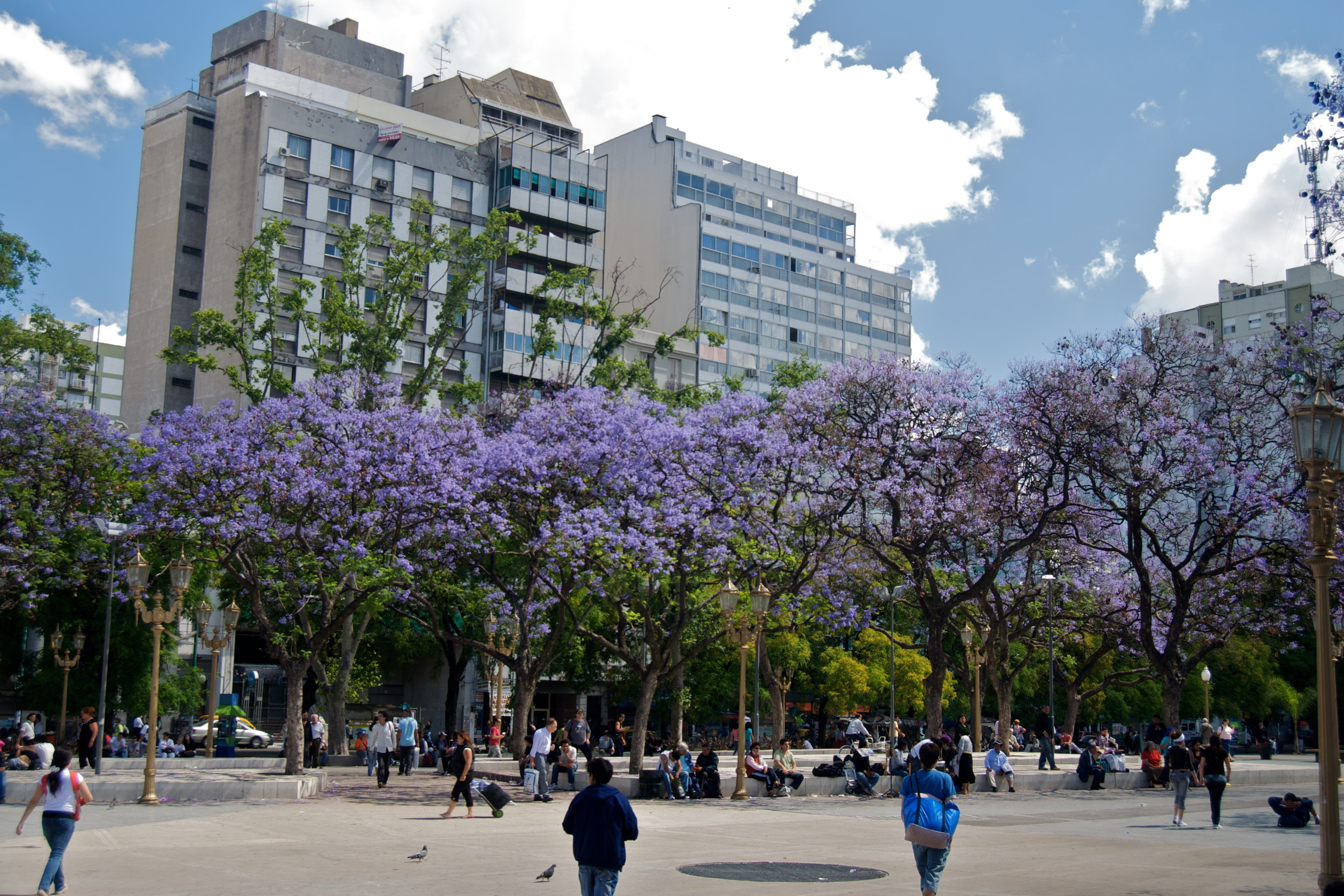
Jacarandas in bloom at Plaza Miserere, Buenos Aires

Springs in Buenos Aires are typically mild during the day with cool to cold nights. The average high is 22.8 °C (73.0 °F) while the average low is 13.4 °C (56.1 °F). It is one of the rainiest seasons in the city, averaging 320.5 mm (12.62 in) of precipitation and 28 days with measurable precipitation. Nonetheless, most precipitation events are short in duration. Spring is characterized by changeable weather with temperatures that can fluctuate. Cold polar air from the south can bring cooler temperatures. An extreme example of this was in November 2007, when cold polar air from the south brought temperatures down to 2.5 °C (36.5 °F) on the morning of 15 November. The same polar air affected many parts of the country, bringing cold temperatures and snow in coastal parts of Patagonia. In contrast, hot humid air from the north produces sultry days; the highest temperature recorded in spring is 36.8 °C (98.2 °F) on 27 November 1955. In some cases, heat waves, (Note: According to the Argentine National Weather Service, a heat wave is defined when there are 3 consecutive days in where the minimum and maximum temperature exceed 22.0 °C (71.6 °F) and 32.3 °C (90.1 °F) respectively.) can occur, particularly in November.

=== Summer ===
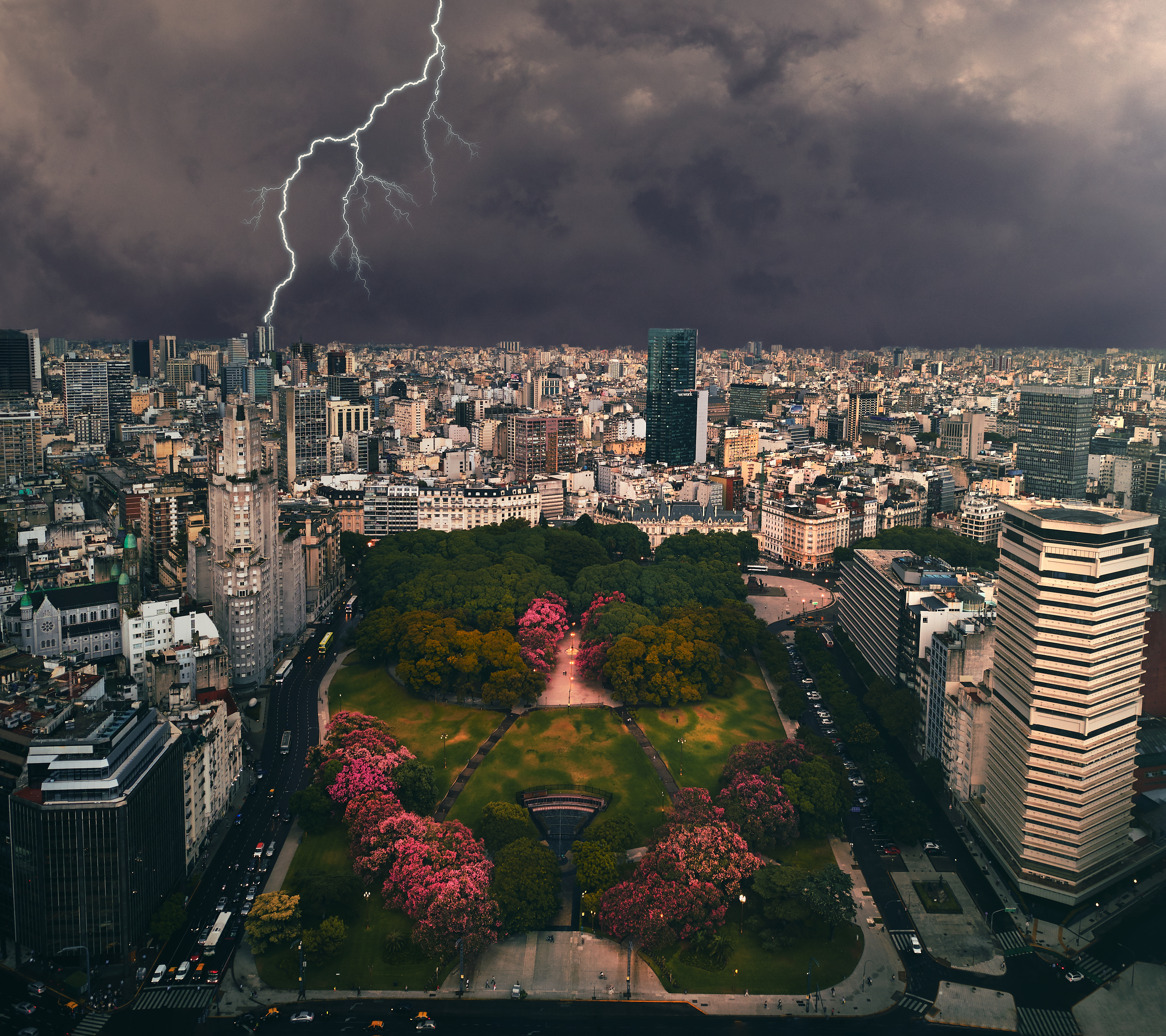
Heavy rain and thunderstorms in Plaza San Martin. Thunderstorms are common during the summer.

Summers are hot and humid. On average, mornings and afternoons are hot whereas temperatures drop considerably at night. The average high is 29.3 °C (84.7 °F) while the average low is 19.4 °C (66.9 °F). With a mean precipitation of 386.5 mm (15.22 in), it is the rainiest season. This is due to high temperatures and high insolation that lead to the development of a low pressure system called the Chaco Low situated over northern Argentina that interacts with the South Atlantic High to generate a pressure gradient that brings moist easterly winds to the region, favouring precipitation, which mostly occurs in the form of convective thunderstorms. The Chaco Low also interacts with the South Atlantic high to bring warm and tropical air from the north which is the strongest in summer when the Chaco Low is at its strongest due to higher insolation.

Heat waves are a common feature of summers in the city. These heat waves place extra demand on electricity usage, leading to shortages. In extreme cases, these power shortages during heat waves can cause traffic jams and protests, such as the ongoing 12-day March 2023 heat wave, the longest heat wave ever recorded in Buenos Aires However, most heat waves are less than a week long, and are followed by the passage of the cold, dry Pampero wind, which brings violent and intense thunderstorms with strong gusts and hail followed by cooler temperatures and lower humidity. Occasionally, a tornado can form, which can strike the city; most tornadoes are relatively weak and rarely cause deaths. The greatest risk for tornadoes occurs in summer due to favourable conditions. These severe storms can damage cars, houses and disrupt public services such as transportation and collection and disposal of urban solid waste.

=== Autumn ===
At the beginning of autumn, temperatures are warm to hot in the afternoon while nights and mornings are mild. Later on in the season, conditions are cooler featuring mild afternoons, and cold nights and mornings. The average high and low are 23.2 °C (73.8 °F) and 14.3 °C (57.7 °F) respectively while precipitation averages 343.8 mm (13.54 in) during this season. Similar to spring, the season is characterized by changeable weather conditions with temperatures that can fluctuate; temperatures as high as 37.9 °C (100.2 °F) and as low as −4.0 °C (24.8 °F) have been recorded. Periods of rainy weather occur although these are usually of short duration. Frosts rarely occur, though they can occur as early as May.

=== Winter ===
Snowfall in Buenos Aires
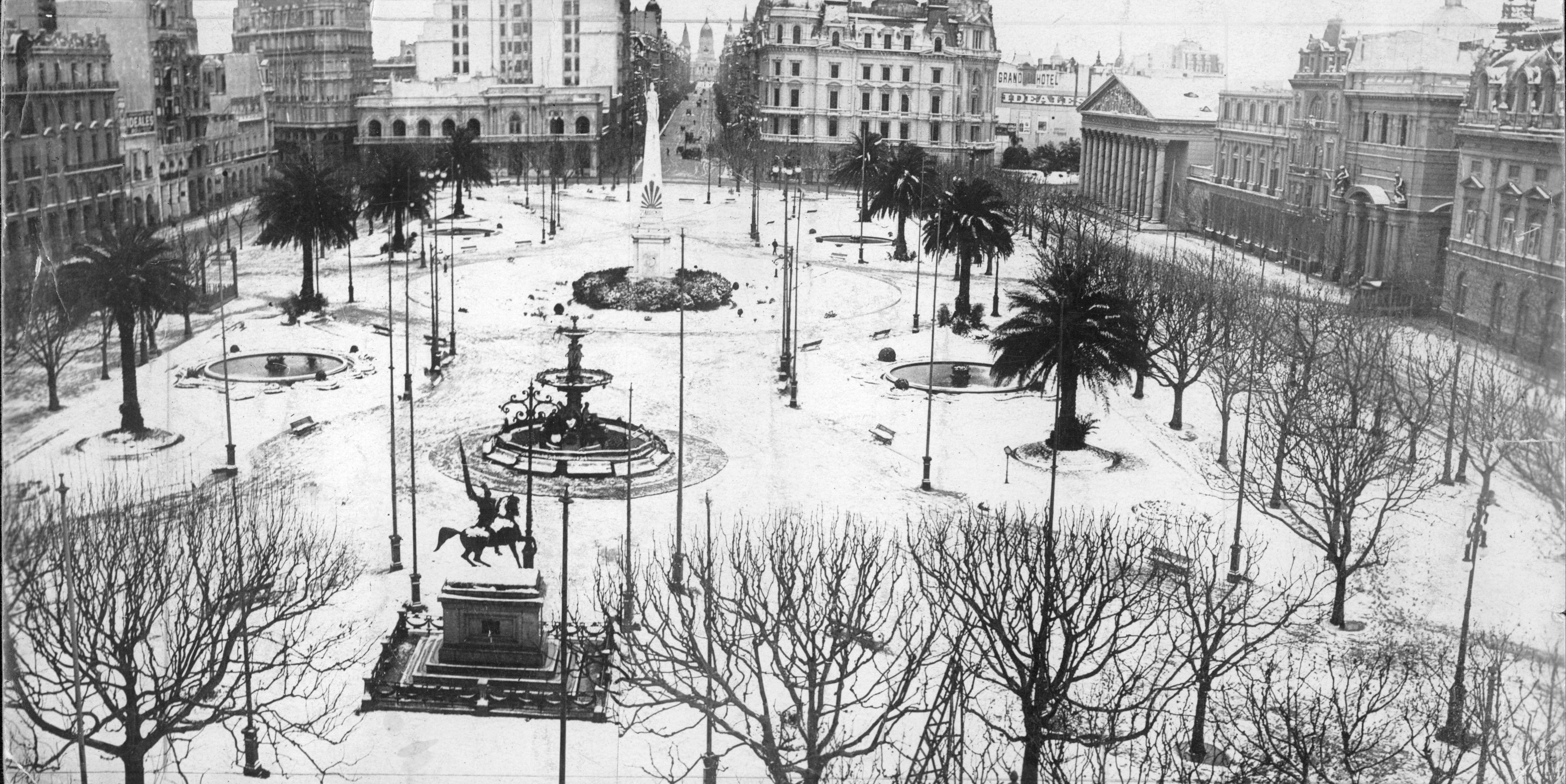
Snow in Plaza de Mayo in 1918

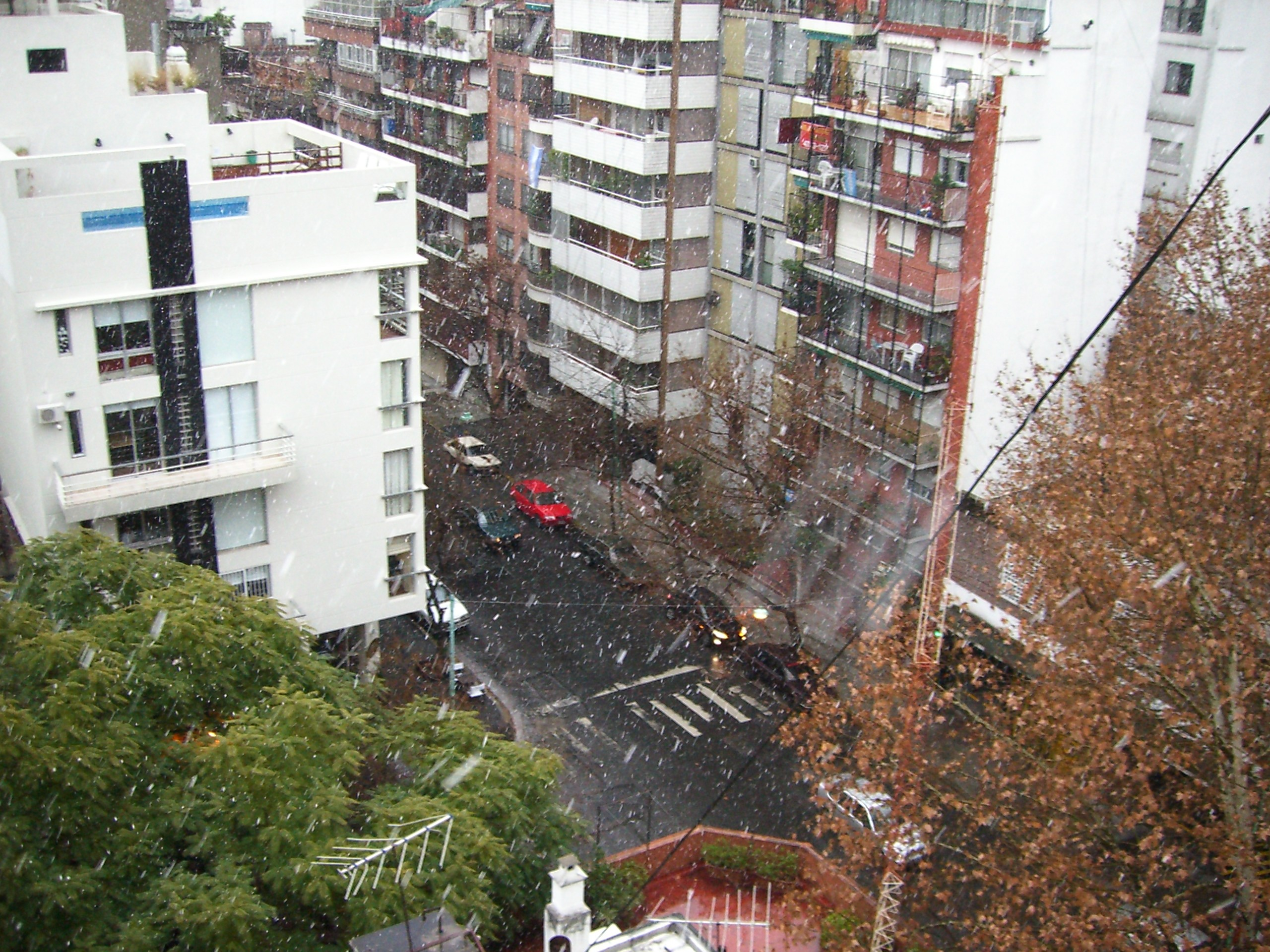
Snow in Buenos Aires in 2007

June to August are the winter months in Buenos Aires. Winters are mild with mild temperatures during the day and cold nights. Highs during the season average 16.6 °C (61.9 °F) while lows average 8.3 °C (46.9 °F). Lows rarely drop below freezing, with the average annual lowest temperature being 0 °C (32.0 °F) at the central observatory. Cold waves can occur in these months in which periods of cold temperatures can persist for days. (Note: According to the Argentine National Weather Service, a cold wave occurs when there are 3 consecutive days where both the minimum and maximum temperatures are less than 3.8 °C (38.8 °F) and 12.6 °C (54.7 °F) respectively) These cold waves, particularly during severe winters lead to increases in energy demand, which can cause significant energy shortages. Snowfall occasionally occurs in the surrounding areas of the city but rarely within Buenos Aires proper; since the start of meteorological observations in 1906 at the central observatory, snowfall has only been observed thrice: June 1918, July 1928, and July 2007. This is due to the city center having higher temperatures than the surrounding areas owing to the urban heat island effect.

Most of the precipitation comes from frontal systems associated with cyclogenesis and strong southeasterly winds (Sudestada), which bring long periods of precipitation, cloudy weather and cooler temperatures. Winters are cloudy while relative humidity is very high, often 90% or higher, making the weather dull, grey and cool. Occasionally, warm air masses from the north bring warmer temperatures. These warm air masses can bring sunny weather, particularly during the afternoon when they come from the north or northwest as a result of a trough located in central Argentina. On the other hand, warm air masses from Brazil bring humid conditions, featuring high humidity with high cloud cover that is typical of a warm front of a frontal system and typical of tropical maritime air. These warm air masses that are responsible for the high humidity and cloud cover are the warmest air masses, leading to the warmest temperatures. Nonetheless, these are short lived as the Chaco Low, which is responsible for bringing in warm and tropical air from the north is weaker in winter due to lower insolation, leading to the winds from the north being less intense and shorter lived.

Towards the end of winter in August, there are important changes in the atmospheric circulation. Warm, humid air penetrates the city, higher solar radiation and frequent synoptic weather disturbances from the west occur during the end of the winter. As such, the end of winter is usually characterized by heavy storms with lightning. This is popularly known as the Santa Rosa Storm, around 30 August. Based on 111 years of weather observations (1906–2016) from the central observatory, 61 years (55% of the time) have seen stormy weather occurring on days close to 30 August, although not all of these have led to heavy precipitation.

== Extremes ==
=== Temperature ===
According to the central observatory, which has one of the most reliable and oldest records in South America, the highest temperature in Buenos Aires, 43.3 °C (109.9 °F), was recorded on 29 January 1957 while the lowest temperature recorded is −5.4 °C (22.3 °F) on 9 July 1918. The warmest year on record is 2023, with a mean annual temperature of 19.2 °C (66.6 °F). On the other hand, 1911 was the coldest year, with a mean annual temperature of 15.4 °C (59.7 °F).

Extreme temperature values (1906–present)
Parameter	Jan	Feb	March	April	May	June	July	Aug	Sept	Oct	Nov	Dec
Warmest mean monthly temperature	26.6 °C (79.9 °F)	25.7 °C (78.3 °F)	26.6 °C (79.9 °F)	20.4 °C (68.7 °F)	17.9 °C (64.2 °F)	15.1 °C (59.2 °F)	15.9 °C (60.6 °F)	15.2 °C (59.4 °F)	16.6 °C (61.9 °F)	20.5 °C (68.9 °F)	24.1 °C (75.4 °F)	26.6 °C (79.9 °F)
Coldest mean monthly temperature	21.7 °C (71.1 °F)	20.0 °C (68.0 °F)	18.1 °C (64.6 °F)	14.2 °C (57.6 °F)	9.8 °C (49.6 °F)	5.7 °C (42.3 °F)	6.8 °C (44.2 °F)	8.9 °C (48.0 °F)	10.7 °C (51.3 °F)	13.6 °C (56.5 °F)	16.7 °C (62.1 °F)	19.8 °C (67.6 °F)
Highest minimum temperature	30.0 °C (86.0 °F)	28.5 °C (83.3 °F)	28.0 °C (82.4 °F)	23.8 °C (74.8 °F)	22.6 °C (72.7 °F)	20.1 °C (68.2 °F)	20.8 °C (69.4 °F)	20.9 °C (69.6 °F)	23.7 °C (74.7 °F)	22.4 °C (72.3 °F)	25.4 °C (77.7 °F)	28.2 °C (82.8 °F)
Lowest maximum temperature	17.5 °C (63.5 °F)	15.9 °C (60.6 °F)	13.8 °C (56.8 °F)	11.1 °C (52.0 °F)	7.3 °C (45.1 °F)	4.3 °C (39.7 °F)	4.8 °C (40.6 °F)	6.4 °C (43.5 °F)	7.0 °C (44.6 °F)	9.6 °C (49.3 °F)	13.0 °C (55.4 °F)	15.9 °C (60.6 °F)

=== Precipitation ===
The year with the maximum precipitation was 1900, when the city received 2,024 mm (79.7 in) of precipitation. On the other hand, 1916 has been the driest year, with a mean annual precipitation of 504 mm (19.8 in). The highest precipitation for a single day was recorded on 27 February 1930, when 194.1 mm (7.64 in) of precipitation fell.

Extreme precipitation values (1906–present)
Parameter	Jan	Feb	March	April	May	June	July	Aug	Sept	Oct	Nov	Dec
Wettest monthly precipitation	347.5 mm (13.7 in)	420.3 mm (16.5 in)	476.6 mm (18.8 in)	404.8 mm (15.9 in)	361.7 mm (14.2 in)	178.5 mm (7.0 in)	212.1 mm (8.4 in)	277.8 mm (10.9 in)	260.1 mm (10.2 in)	367.1 mm (14.5 in)	284.1 mm (11.2 in)	318.5 mm (12.5 in)
Driest monthly precipitation	3.4 mm (0.1 in)	0.7 mm (0.03 in)	2.2 mm (0.1 in)	5.0 mm (0.2 in)	0.5 mm (0.02 in)	0.0 mm (0.00 in)	0.0 mm (0 in)	0.0 mm (0 in)	1.7 mm (0.1 in)	4.1 mm (0.2 in)	11.9 mm (0.5 in)	5.9 mm (0.2 in)
Highest precipitation in a single day	172.7 mm (6.8 in)	194.1 mm (7.6 in)	109.0 mm (4.3 in)	159.0 mm (6.3 in)	188.4 mm (7.4 in)	78.7 mm (3.1 in)	90.0 mm (3.5 in)	96.8 mm (3.8 in)	103.6 mm (4.1 in)	132.0 mm (5.2 in)	138.5 mm (5.5 in)	124.1 mm (4.9 in)

== Statistics ==
Climate data for Buenos Aires Central Observatory, located in Agronomía (1991–2020, extremes 1906–present)
Month	Jan	Feb	Mar	Apr	May	Jun	Jul	Aug	Sep	Oct	Nov	Dec	Year
Record high °C (°F)	43.3 (109.9)	38.7 (101.7)	38.9 (102.0)	36.0 (96.8)	31.6 (88.9)	28.5 (83.3)	30.2 (86.4)	34.4 (93.9)	35.3 (95.5)	36.3 (97.3)	36.8 (98.2)	40.5 (104.9)	43.3 (109.9)
Mean daily maximum °C (°F)	30.1 (86.2)	28.9 (84.0)	27.0 (80.6)	23.2 (73.8)	19.4 (66.9)	16.4 (61.5)	15.5 (59.9)	17.9 (64.2)	19.7 (67.5)	22.6 (72.7)	26.0 (78.8)	29.0 (84.2)	22.9 (73.2)
Daily mean °C (°F)	24.9 (76.8)	23.8 (74.8)	22.0 (71.6)	18.2 (64.8)	14.8 (58.6)	12.0 (53.6)	11.0 (51.8)	13.0 (55.4)	14.9 (58.8)	17.9 (64.2)	20.9 (69.6)	23.6 (74.5)	18.1 (64.6)
Mean daily minimum °C (°F)	20.2 (68.4)	19.4 (66.9)	17.7 (63.9)	14.1 (57.4)	11.1 (52.0)	8.4 (47.1)	7.5 (45.5)	8.9 (48.0)	10.6 (51.1)	13.4 (56.1)	16.1 (61.0)	18.5 (65.3)	13.8 (56.8)
Record low °C (°F)	5.9 (42.6)	4.2 (39.6)	2.8 (37.0)	−2.3 (27.9)	−4 (25)	−5.3 (22.5)	−5.4 (22.3)	−4 (25)	−2.4 (27.7)	−2 (28)	1.6 (34.9)	3.7 (38.7)	−5.4 (22.3)
Average precipitation mm (inches)	134.4 (5.29)	129.3 (5.09)	120.0 (4.72)	130.3 (5.13)	93.5 (3.68)	61.5 (2.42)	74.4 (2.93)	70.3 (2.77)	80.6 (3.17)	122.9 (4.84)	117.6 (4.63)	122.8 (4.83)	1,257.6 (49.51)
Average precipitation days	8.9	8.0	8.2	8.9	7.2	7.3	7.4	7.0	7.4	10.2	8.9	8.9	98.3
Average snowy days	0.0	0.0	0.0	0.0	0.0	0.1	0.1	0.0	0.0	0.0	0.0	0.0	0.1
Average relative humidity (%)	64.6	69.1	72.0	75.6	78.7	78.2	77.0	72.6	69.5	69.4	65.3	62.8	71.2
Mean monthly sunshine hours	272.8	223.2	217.0	168.0	158.1	135.0	142.6	170.5	180.0	204.6	246.0	266.6	2,384.4
Mean daily sunshine hours	8.8	7.9	7.0	5.6	5.1	4.5	4.6	5.5	6.0	6.6	8.2	8.6	6.5
Source: Servicio Meteorológico Nacional

Climate data for Jorge Newbery Airfield, located in Palermo (1991–2020, extremes 1961–present)
Month	Jan	Feb	Mar	Apr	May	Jun	Jul	Aug	Sep	Oct	Nov	Dec	Year
Record high °C (°F)	37.5 (99.5)	37.4 (99.3)	36.2 (97.2)	32.5 (90.5)	29.0 (84.2)	26.9 (80.4)	26.7 (80.1)	32.0 (89.6)	30.7 (87.3)	34.6 (94.3)	35.6 (96.1)	39.6 (103.3)	39.6 (103.3)
Mean daily maximum °C (°F)	28.4 (83.1)	27.3 (81.1)	25.5 (77.9)	22.0 (71.6)	18.4 (65.1)	15.5 (59.9)	14.4 (57.9)	16.5 (61.7)	18.3 (64.9)	21.1 (70.0)	24.5 (76.1)	27.4 (81.3)	21.6 (70.9)
Daily mean °C (°F)	24.5 (76.1)	23.7 (74.7)	22.0 (71.6)	18.5 (65.3)	15.2 (59.4)	12.3 (54.1)	11.3 (52.3)	12.9 (55.2)	14.7 (58.5)	17.7 (63.9)	20.6 (69.1)	23.2 (73.8)	18.0 (64.4)
Mean daily minimum °C (°F)	20.8 (69.4)	20.2 (68.4)	18.8 (65.8)	15.3 (59.5)	12.3 (54.1)	9.4 (48.9)	8.4 (47.1)	9.7 (49.5)	11.5 (52.7)	14.3 (57.7)	16.8 (62.2)	19.2 (66.6)	14.7 (58.5)
Record low °C (°F)	10.0 (50.0)	8.3 (46.9)	4.5 (40.1)	3.6 (38.5)	0.8 (33.4)	−4.8 (23.4)	−2.0 (28.4)	−0.9 (30.4)	0.6 (33.1)	2.4 (36.3)	5.8 (42.4)	7.0 (44.6)	−4.8 (23.4)
Average precipitation mm (inches)	117.5 (4.63)	112.3 (4.42)	111.8 (4.40)	108.3 (4.26)	83.3 (3.28)	54.6 (2.15)	64.3 (2.53)	61.5 (2.42)	72.6 (2.86)	104.7 (4.12)	103.2 (4.06)	112.8 (4.44)	1,106.9 (43.58)
Average precipitation days (≥ 0.1 mm)	7.9	7.3	7.2	8.1	6.3	6.2	6.6	6.0	6.6	9.1	8.1	7.8	87.2
Average snowy days	0.0	0.0	0.0	0.0	0.0	0.0	0.1	0.0	0.0	0.0	0.0	0.0	0.1
Average relative humidity (%)	64.6	69.1	72.0	75.6	78.7	78.2	77.0	72.6	69.5	69.4	65.3	62.8	71.2
Mean monthly sunshine hours	285.2	243.0	235.6	192.0	173.6	150.0	155.0	182.9	198.0	220.1	261.0	288.3	2,584.7
Mean daily sunshine hours	9.2	8.6	7.6	6.4	5.6	5.0	5.0	5.9	6.6	7.1	8.7	9.3	7.1
Source: Servicio Meteorológico Nacional

Climate data for Buenos Aires Central Observatory (1961–1990)
Month	Jan	Feb	Mar	Apr	May	Jun	Jul	Aug	Sep	Oct	Nov	Dec	Year
Mean daily maximum °C (°F)	29.9 (85.8)	28.6 (83.5)	26.3 (79.3)	22.8 (73.0)	19.3 (66.7)	15.7 (60.3)	15.4 (59.7)	17.1 (62.8)	19.3 (66.7)	22.1 (71.8)	25.2 (77.4)	28.2 (82.8)	22.5 (72.5)
Daily mean °C (°F)	24.5 (76.1)	23.4 (74.1)	21.3 (70.3)	17.6 (63.7)	14.4 (57.9)	11.2 (52.2)	11.0 (51.8)	12.3 (54.1)	14.4 (57.9)	17.2 (63.0)	20.3 (68.5)	23.0 (73.4)	17.5 (63.5)
Mean daily minimum °C (°F)	19.6 (67.3)	18.9 (66.0)	16.9 (62.4)	13.3 (55.9)	10.4 (50.7)	7.7 (45.9)	7.6 (45.7)	8.3 (46.9)	10.0 (50.0)	12.7 (54.9)	15.4 (59.7)	18.1 (64.6)	13.2 (55.8)
Average precipitation mm (inches)	119.0 (4.69)	117.6 (4.63)	134.1 (5.28)	97.0 (3.82)	73.6 (2.90)	62.6 (2.46)	66.3 (2.61)	69.8 (2.75)	73.3 (2.89)	119.0 (4.69)	108.6 (4.28)	105.0 (4.13)	1,145.9 (45.11)
Average precipitation days (≥ 0.1 mm)	9	8	9	8	8	7	8	8	7	10	9	9	100
Average relative humidity (%)	64	68	72	76	77	79	79	74	70	69	66	63	71
Mean monthly sunshine hours	279.0	240.8	229.0	220.0	173.6	132.0	142.6	173.6	189.0	227.0	252.0	266.6	2,525.2
Source 1: NOAA
Source 2: Servicio Meteorológico Nacional (precipitation days), Deutscher Wetterdienst (sun) (Note: The World Meteorological Organization Station ID for Buenos Aires Observatorio is 87585 Use this station ID to locate the sunshine duration)

Climate data for Jorge Newbery Airfield (1961–1990)
Month	Jan	Feb	Mar	Apr	May	Jun	Jul	Aug	Sep	Oct	Nov	Dec	Year
Mean daily maximum °C (°F)	28.6 (83.5)	27.4 (81.3)	25.3 (77.5)	21.8 (71.2)	18.3 (64.9)	15.0 (59.0)	14.5 (58.1)	15.9 (60.6)	17.9 (64.2)	20.9 (69.6)	24.2 (75.6)	27.1 (80.8)	21.4 (70.5)
Daily mean °C (°F)	24.3 (75.7)	23.3 (73.9)	21.4 (70.5)	17.9 (64.2)	14.7 (58.5)	11.4 (52.5)	11.1 (52.0)	12.2 (54.0)	14.1 (57.4)	17.1 (62.8)	20.1 (68.2)	22.8 (73.0)	17.5 (63.5)
Mean daily minimum °C (°F)	20.3 (68.5)	19.7 (67.5)	17.9 (64.2)	14.6 (58.3)	11.5 (52.7)	8.4 (47.1)	8.2 (46.8)	9.1 (48.4)	10.7 (51.3)	13.4 (56.1)	16.2 (61.2)	18.8 (65.8)	14.1 (57.4)
Average precipitation mm (inches)	98.4 (3.87)	107.6 (4.24)	125.4 (4.94)	88.6 (3.49)	71.1 (2.80)	55.5 (2.19)	62.0 (2.44)	66.7 (2.63)	65.8 (2.59)	110.5 (4.35)	104.8 (4.13)	96.6 (3.80)	1,053 (41.46)
Average precipitation days (≥ 0.1 mm)	8	8	8	7	7	7	7	7	7	10	9	9	94
Average relative humidity (%)	68	71	73	75	77	78	80	75	73	72	69	67	73
Mean monthly sunshine hours	251.1	238.0	226.3	192.0	161.2	123.0	133.3	170.5	189.0	217.0	231.0	241.8	2,374.2
Percentage possible sunshine	56	63	60	57	50	42	43	50	52	54	55	54	53
Source 1: NOAA
Source 2: Servicio Meteorológico Nacional (precipitation days 1961–1990)

== See also ==
- Climate of Argentina
- Climatic regions of Argentina
- Pampas

== Books ==
- Araus, José; Slafer, Gustavo (2015). Crop Stress Management and Global Climate Change. CAB International. ISBN 978-1-84593-680-8.
- Blouet, Brian; Blouet, Olwyn (2010). "Chapter 13: Argentina, Uruguay, and Paraguay". Latin America and the Caribbean: A Systematic and Regional Survey. John Wiley & Sons. pp. 385–415. ISBN 978-0-470-38773-3.
- Fittkau, E.; Illies, J.; Klinge, H.; Schwabe, G. (1969). Biogeography and Ecology in South America. Springer. ISBN 978-94-011-9731-1.
- Isla, Federico; Enrique, Schnack (2009). "Chapter 3: The Changing Coastlines of South America" (PDF). In Latrubesse, Edgardo (ed.). Developments in Earth Surface Processes: Natural Hazards and Human–Exacerbated Disasters in Latin America. Elsevier. pp. 333–349. doi:10.1016/S0928-2025(08)10003-7. ISBN 978-0-444-53117-9.
- Kreimer, Alcira; Arnold, Margaret (2000). Managing Disaster Risk in Emerging Economies (PDF). Disaster Risk Management Series No. 2. Washington D.C: World Bank. ISBN 978-0-8213-4726-3.
- Krishna, K. (2015). Agricultural Prairies: Natural Resources and Crop Productivity. CRC Press. ISBN 978-1-4822-5806-6.
- Lydolph, Paul (1985). The Climate of the Earth. Rowman & Littlefield Publishers, Inc. ISBN 978-0-86598-119-5.
- Veblen, Thomas; Young, Kenneth; Orme, Antony, eds. (2007). The Physical Geography of South America. Oxford University Press. ISBN 978-0-19-531341-3.
