= Sudestada =

Phenomenon in Rio de la Plata, South America

Sudestada (Southeast blow) is the Argentine and Uruguayan name for a climatic phenomenon common to the Río de la Plata (an estuary formed by the combination of the Uruguay River and the Paraná River on the southeastern coastline of South America) and its surrounding region. The phenomenon consists of a sudden rotation of cold southern winds to the south-east. This change, while moderating the cold temperatures, loads the air masses with oceanic humidity, bringing heavy rain and rough seas in the coastal regions. The air circulation also increases the intensity of the winds. The Sudestada is most likely to happen between July and October. It is analogous to the nor'easters in the northern hemisphere.

== Types and causes of sudestada ==
A sudestada may take place with or (less commonly) without precipitation. The latter is caused by a high pressure system, centered on the southwest of Buenos Aires Province in Argentina, bringing persistent 25 up to 45 knots strong winds to the mouth of the Río de la Plata.

A sudestada with rain, on the other hand, is generated by the combined effect of two systems: a high pressure one located on the Atlantic Ocean off the coast of central Patagonia, which brings cold sea air to the east of Buenos Aires Province and the south of the Argentine littoral and Uruguay, and a low pressure system, located over the center-south of Argentine Mesopotamia and western Uruguay, which brings hot, humid air to the same region. As the pressure in the latter system drops, winds from the southeast increase.

== See also ==
- 2005 storm in Uruguay
- 2012 storm in Uruguay
- Pampero
- Zonda
- "Sudestada", a track from Siempre es hoy by Gustavo Cerati
