= August 2009 Argentine winter heat wave =

Heat Wave in Argentina

Meteorological history
- Duration: 26-31 August 2009
- Heat event

Overall effects
- Areas affected: Northern-Centre regions of Argentina

The 2009 Argentine winter heat wave was a period of unusual and exceptionally hot weather that arrived at the end of the winter in August 2009 in Argentina. Several provinces of the country were most affected. Several records were broken. August 2009 was the warmest month since official measurements began. On 30 August 2009, it felt like the middle of summer late last week in the heart of Argentina even with the calendar showing more than three weeks remaining in the Southern Hemisphere winter.

A shot of tropical heat drawn unusually far southward hiked temperatures 30 °C (54 °F) above normal in the city of Buenos Aires and across the north-central regions of the country.

Even though normal high temperatures for late August are near 16 °C (61 °F), readings topped 30 °C (86 °F) degrees at midweek, then topped out above 32 °C (90 °F) degrees during the weekend.

Temperatures hit 33.8 °C (90 °F) on 29 August and finally 34.6 °C (90 °F) on 31 August in Buenos Aires, making it the hottest day ever recorded in winter breaking the 1996 winter record of 33.7 °C (90 °F).

Elsewhere in Argentina, the mid-northern city of Córdoba reached a dramatic high of 37.8 °C (100 °F) degrees on 29 August 2009. Another northern city, Santa Fe, registered 38.3 °C (101 °F) degrees on 30 August, compared to the normal high of around 18 °C (64 °F).

== See also ==
- July 2007 Argentine winter storm
