= 2005 storm in Uruguay =

2005 extratropical cyclone in Uruguay

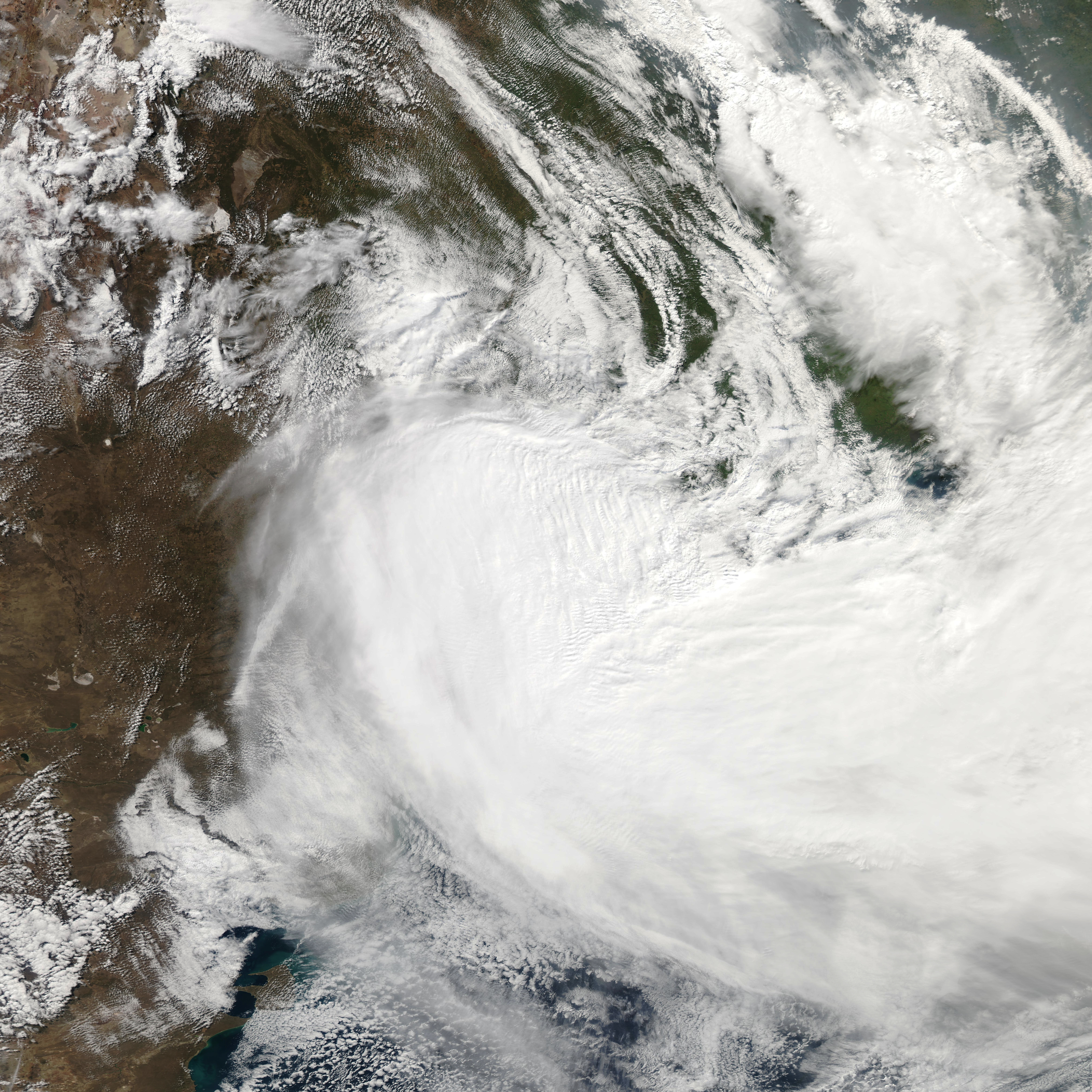
- The system over Argentina on August 23

Meteorological history
- Formed: August 23, 2005
- Dissipated: August 24, 2005

Extratropical cyclone
- Highest winds: 116 mph (187 km/h)
- Lowest pressure: 980 mb (980 hPa)

Overall effects
- Casualties: 10 in Uruguay, 2 in Argentina
- Areas affected: Southern Uruguay

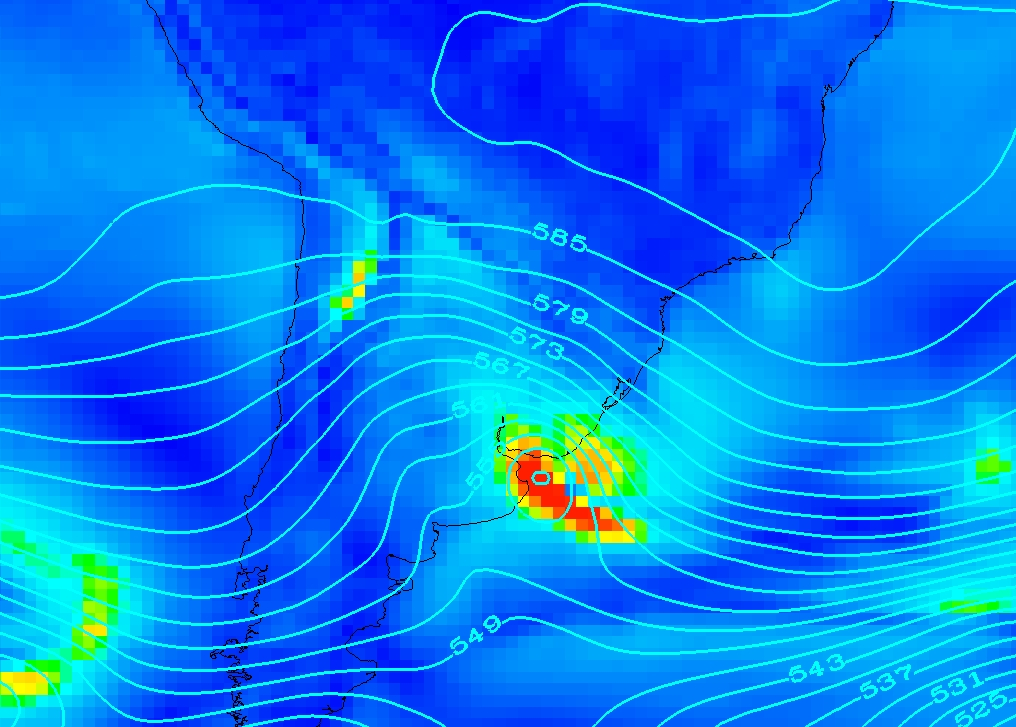
Wind gusts at 00Z on August 24, 2005, over Uruguay. This particular weather system produced gusts of up to 200 km/h.

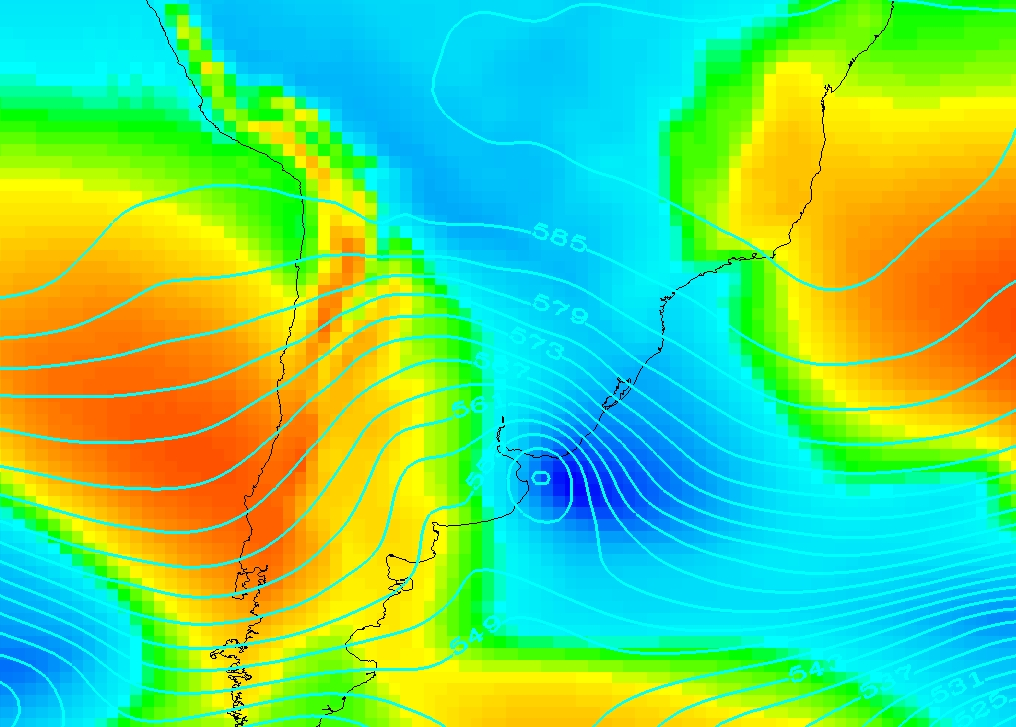
Sea level pressure at 00Z on August 24, 2005, over Uruguay.

In 2005, a heavy storm swept across southern Uruguay from 23 to 24 August. The storm started at the River Plate, entered Uruguayan territory at Kiyú (San José) and moved towards Juanicó (Canelones), where it died down.

This storm produced strong winds which exceeded 187 km/h. Destruction was severe in the affected cities in Uruguay and Argentina.

== Aftermath ==
Meteorologists considered this to be an extratropical cyclone.

Many years later, Uruguayan people keep commenting this cyclone as the worst they remember. The 2005 storm is widely regarded as the worst disaster to befall Uruguay in recent years, even prompting United Nations intervention. The storm caused most of its serious damage in Canelones, Montevideo, San Jose, Colonia and Maldonado. These combined cities contain about 70% of the entire country's population. Reestablishment of public services was slow due to a lack of resources, including power saws, emergency shelter, and other essentials like mattresses, blankets, sheets, hygiene kits, and diapers.

10 people were reported dead, including two teenagers who died when an antenna was blown into their house. Three people were killed by an uprooted trees, displaying the severe winds that were associated with this storm. and dozens were injured, a high number of fatalities for a small country like Uruguay. In addition to this, thousands of homes were damaged with most of the damage occurring to roofing. Over 20,000 people lost electricity and phone service. The same storm in Argentina cause two deaths and forced the evacuation of 2,400 people in downtown Buenos Aires.

== Culture ==
Each year as the end of August nears, Uruguayans and Argentinians prepare for "La Tormenta de Santa Rosa" or the Santa Rosa storm. According to local legend, this storm is predicted to occur anywhere from five days before or after August 30, which also happens to be the annual celebration of the festival of Santa Rosa. The legend originated from the belief that Isabel Flores de Oliva concocted a deadly storm to prevent Dutch pirates from attacking the city of Lima in 1615. It is believed by locals to be the deadliest storm of the year.

This particular storm is believed by many to be the Santa Rosa storm of 2005, despite the fact that it occurred on the six to seven days before the 30th of August. The Santa Rosa storm does not necessarily have to be an extratropical cyclone, and usually is not.

== See also ==
- Hurricane Catarina
- 2012 storm in Uruguay
- Santa Rosa storm
- Climate of Uruguay
