= 2012 storm in southern Uruguay =

Weather event in Uruguay

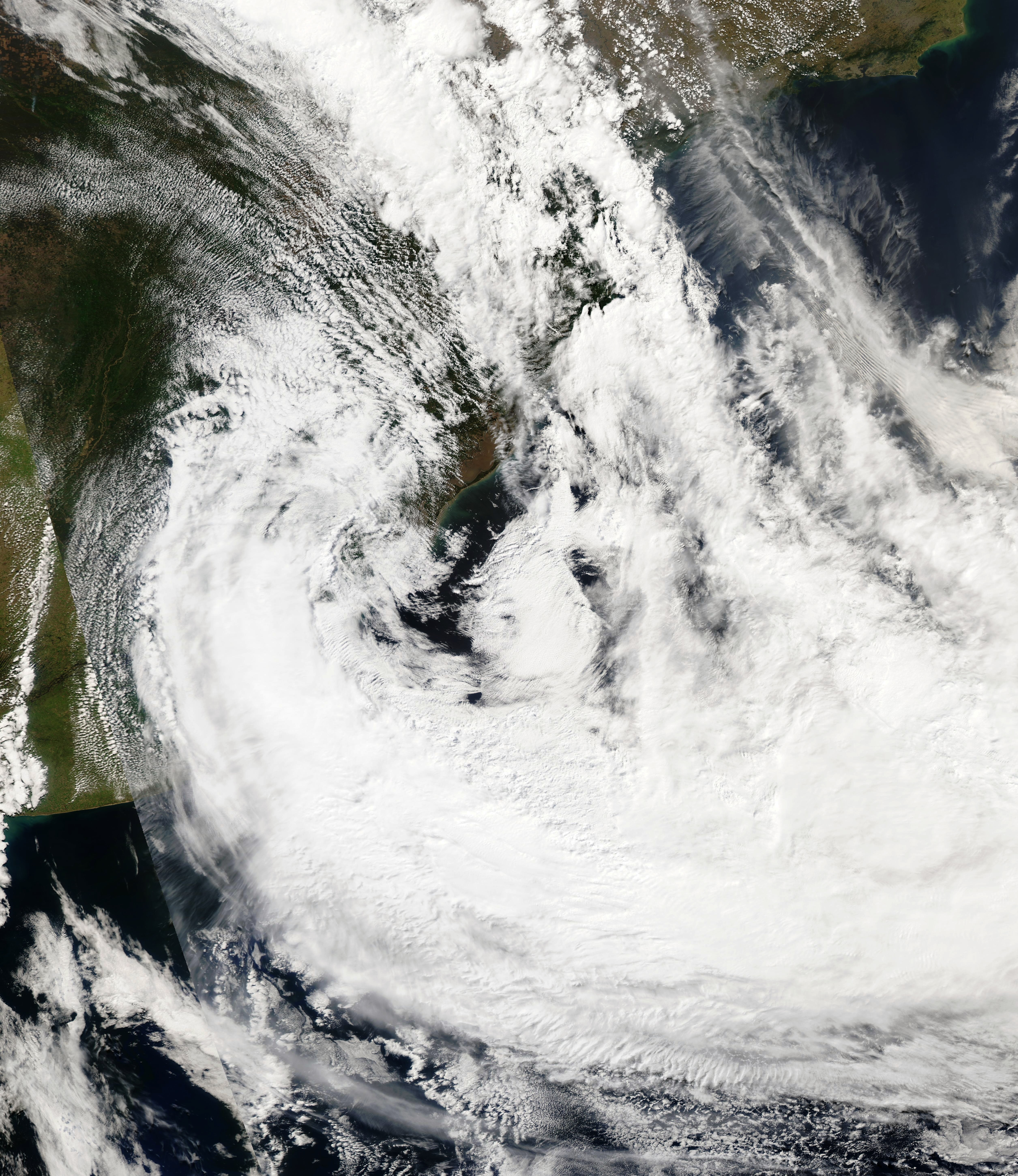

Meteorological history
- Formed: September 18, 2012
- Dissipated: September 19, 2012

Extratropical cyclone
- Highest winds: 172 km/h (107 mph)
- Lowest pressure: 992 mb (992 hPa)

Overall effects
- Casualties: 3 total
- Areas affected: Southern Uruguay

In 2012, a strong storm swept across southern Uruguay from 18 to 19 September.

== Facts ==
The main area affected were the departments on the River Plate and Atlantic coasts: Colonia, San José, Montevideo, Canelones, Maldonado, Rocha.

The strongest winds were in Punta del Este (172 km/h), Montevideo (122 km/h), Laguna del Sauce (120 km/h), Colonia (103 km/h), San José (102 km/h), Melo (98 km/h), Tacuarembó (87 km/h), Rivera (83 km/h).

The government was forced to close public buildings, suspend transport and recommend residents in the capital Montevideo and other locations along the coast to remain at home. It was the week of spring holidays, so children did not have to attend school.

== Aftermath ==
Meteorologists considered this to be an extratropical cyclone.

General comment was that his cyclone was less severe than the 2005 storm.

Three people were reported dead in San José, due to a flood.

This storm is part of a regional phenomenon, called sudestada, covering also Argentina, Paraguay, and Bolivia, where other people were reported dead as well.
