= Santa Rosa storm =

Storm in the Southern Hemisphere

The Santa Rosa Storm occurs in the Southern Hemisphere up to fifteen days earlier than or fifteen days later than the festival of Santa Rosa of Lima, Peru, celebrated on August 30 each year.

Legend has it that Isabel Flores de Oliva, also known as Rose of Lima (Spanish: Rosa de Lima), caused a mighty storm which prevented Dutch pirates from attacking the city of Lima in 1615. However, meteorologists attribute the storm to the clash of the first warm winds, which are a product of the arrival of spring with cold fronts.

The legend is very popular in Argentina and Uruguay, especially around the Rio de la Plata area (including Buenos Aires and Montevideo) and the Argentinian province of Córdoba and the Cuyo region, west of Buenos Aires.

== Myth and reality ==
Accumulated rainfall for the Santa Rosa storm period (August 20 to September 20 approx.) 1861 - 2003
Year	Period	Rainfall (mm)
1870	08/30	28
1876	08/29 to 08/30	73
1922	08/29 to 09/01	80
1923	08/27 to 09/03	80
1942	08/31 to 09/02	98
1956	08/29 to 08/31	97
1959	08/30 to 09/01	55
1983	08/26 to 08/31	60
1986	08/29 to 09/03	68
1992	08/29 to 09/02	54
1993	08/30 to 09/01	49
1994	08/31 to 09/02	39
1996	08/25 to 08/26	22
2001	08/26 to 08/27	59
2002	08/28	13
2003	09/03 to 09/07	88
Source: Metsul

Climate data show that the storm is one of the first to form at the end of Southern winter, some 10 days before August 20 and September 20.

In popular belief, the Santa Rosa storm is one of the most violent of the year. However, reality is different. For the City of Buenos Aires (according to the Villa Ortúzar SMN Observatory), the storm has only appeared five days before or after the 30 August on sixteen occasions since 1861. However, showers are frequent in this period, which helps keep the myth alive.

Out of the sixteen storms, seven have occurred since 1992, probably owing to global warming.
