= Argentine Northwest =

Coordinates: 26°S 66°W

Argentine Northwest Noroeste argentino (Spanish)
- Region
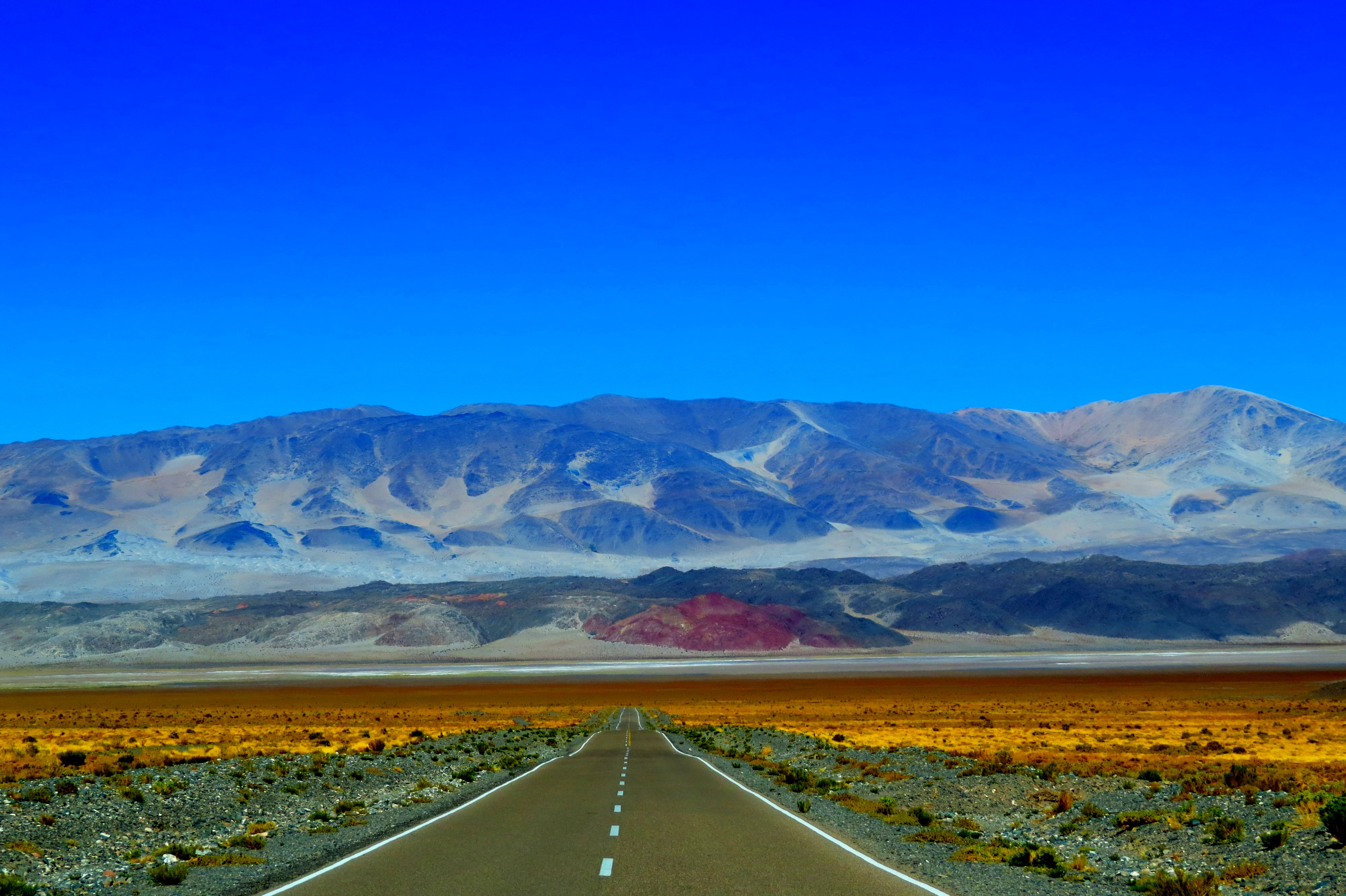
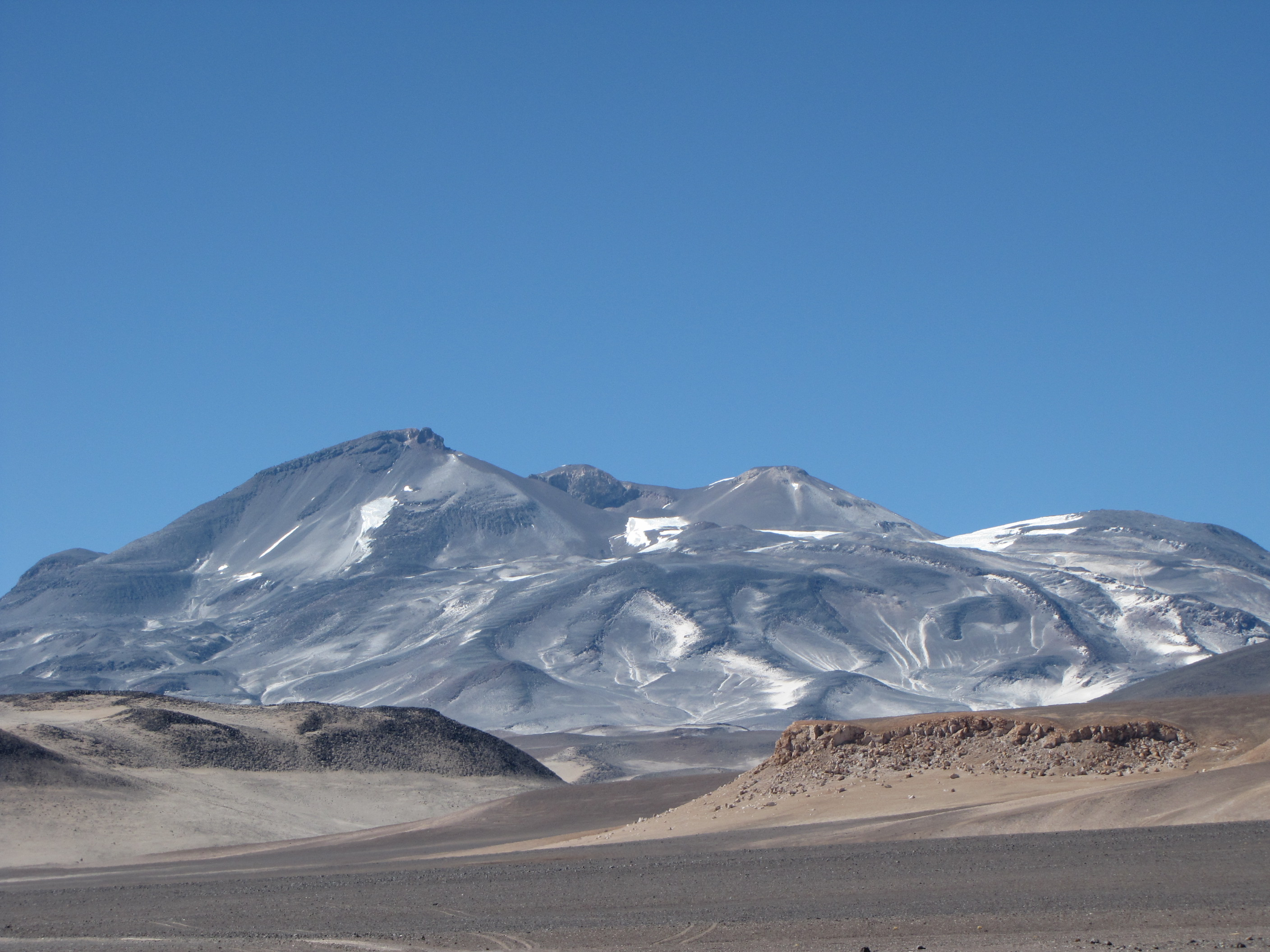
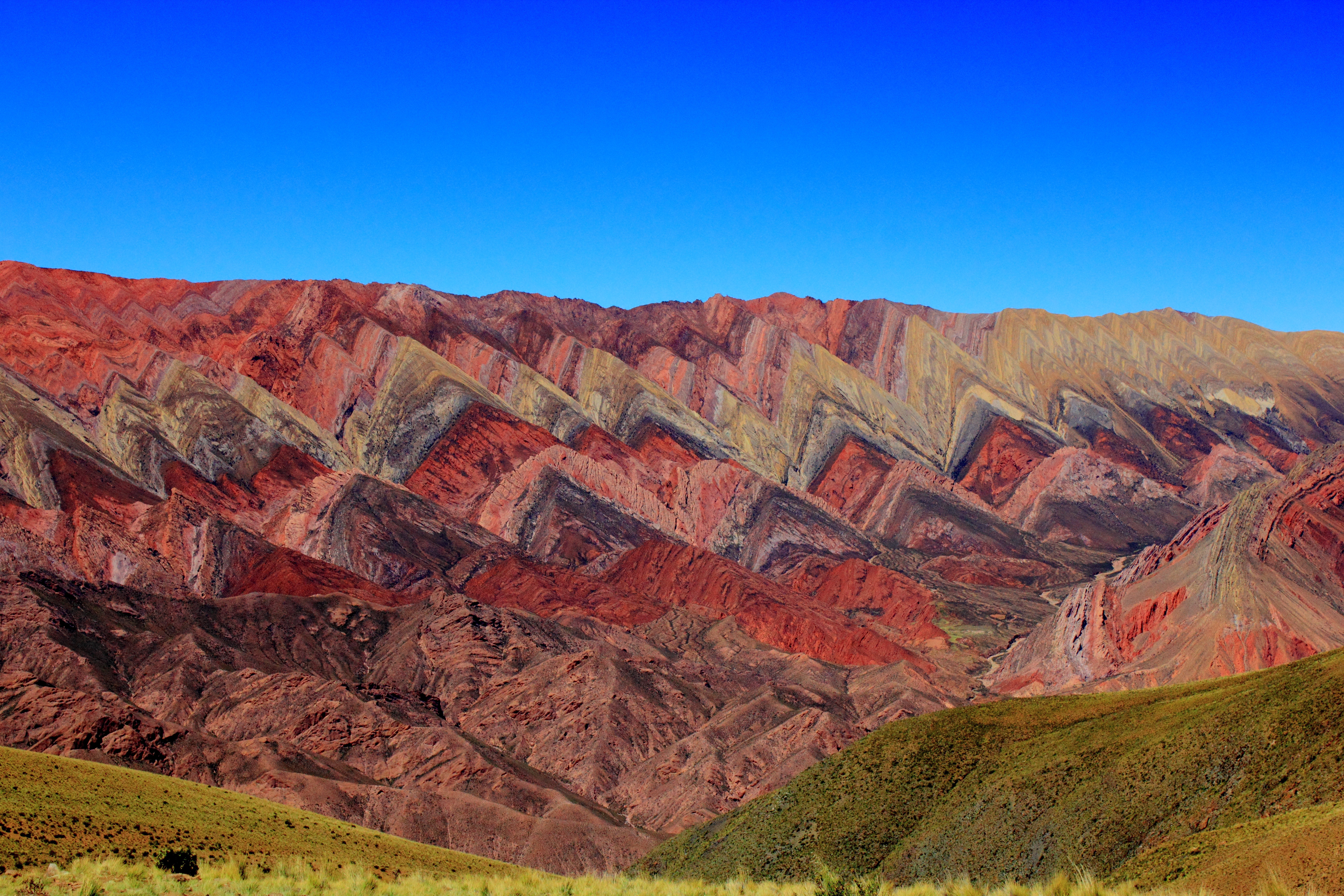
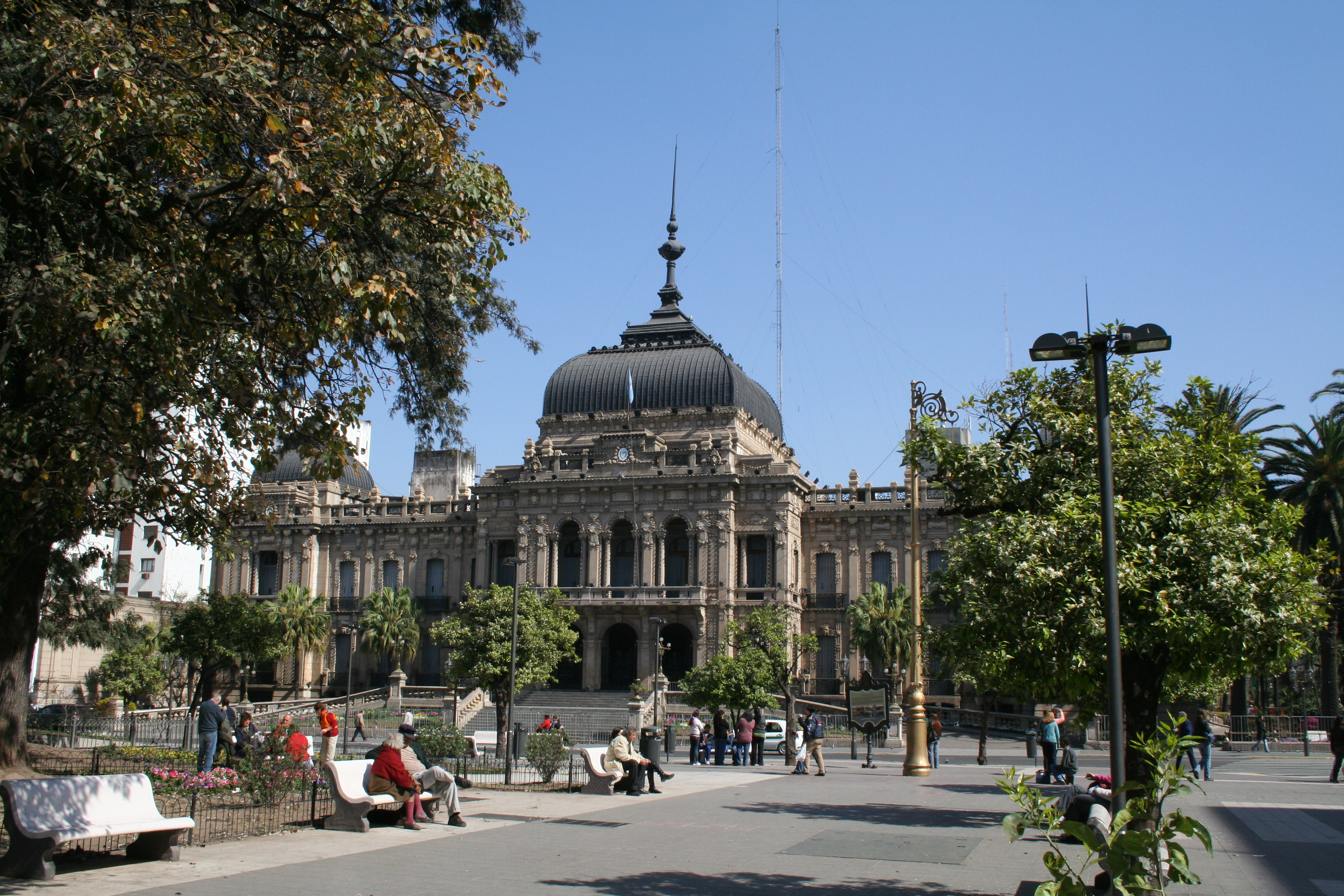
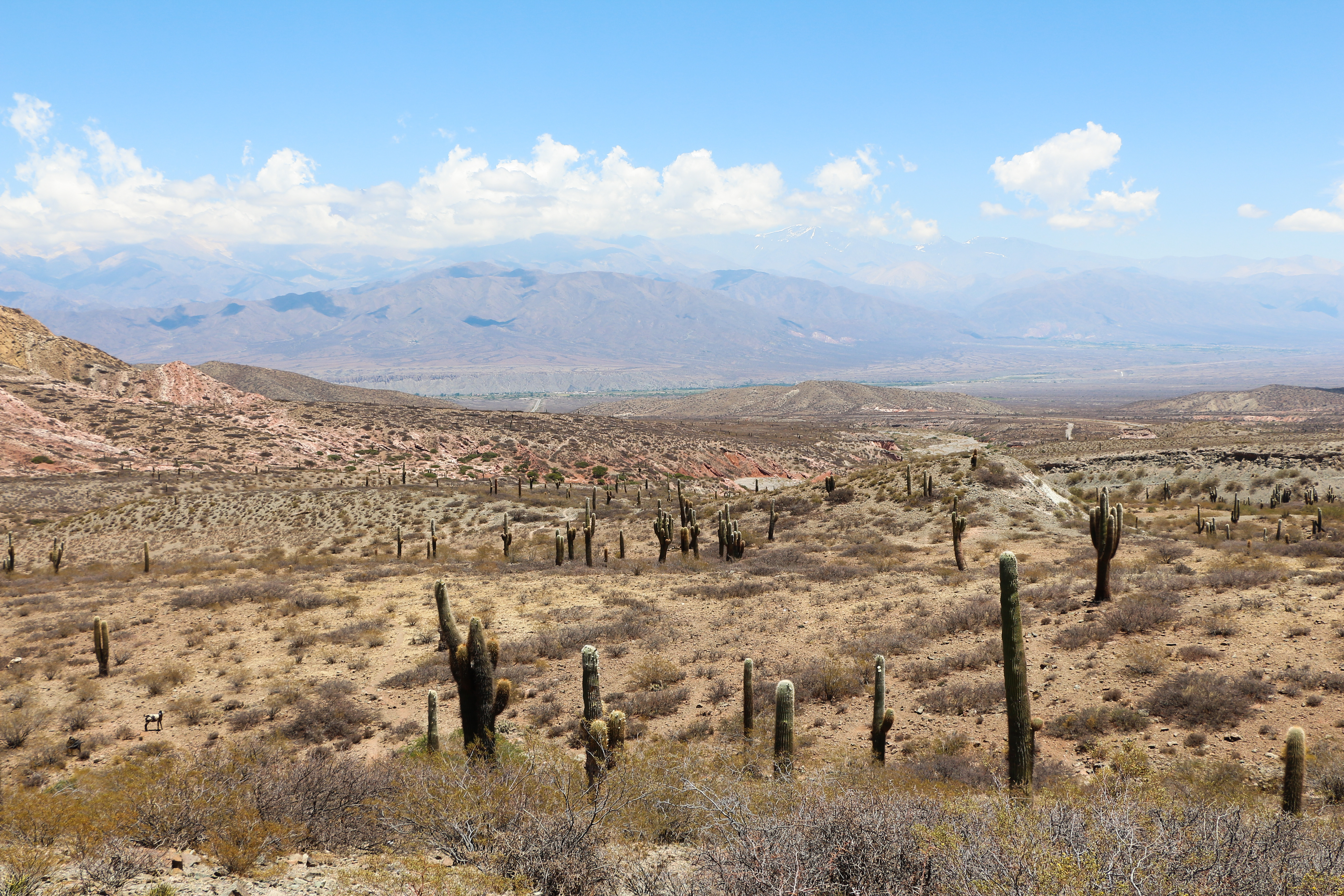
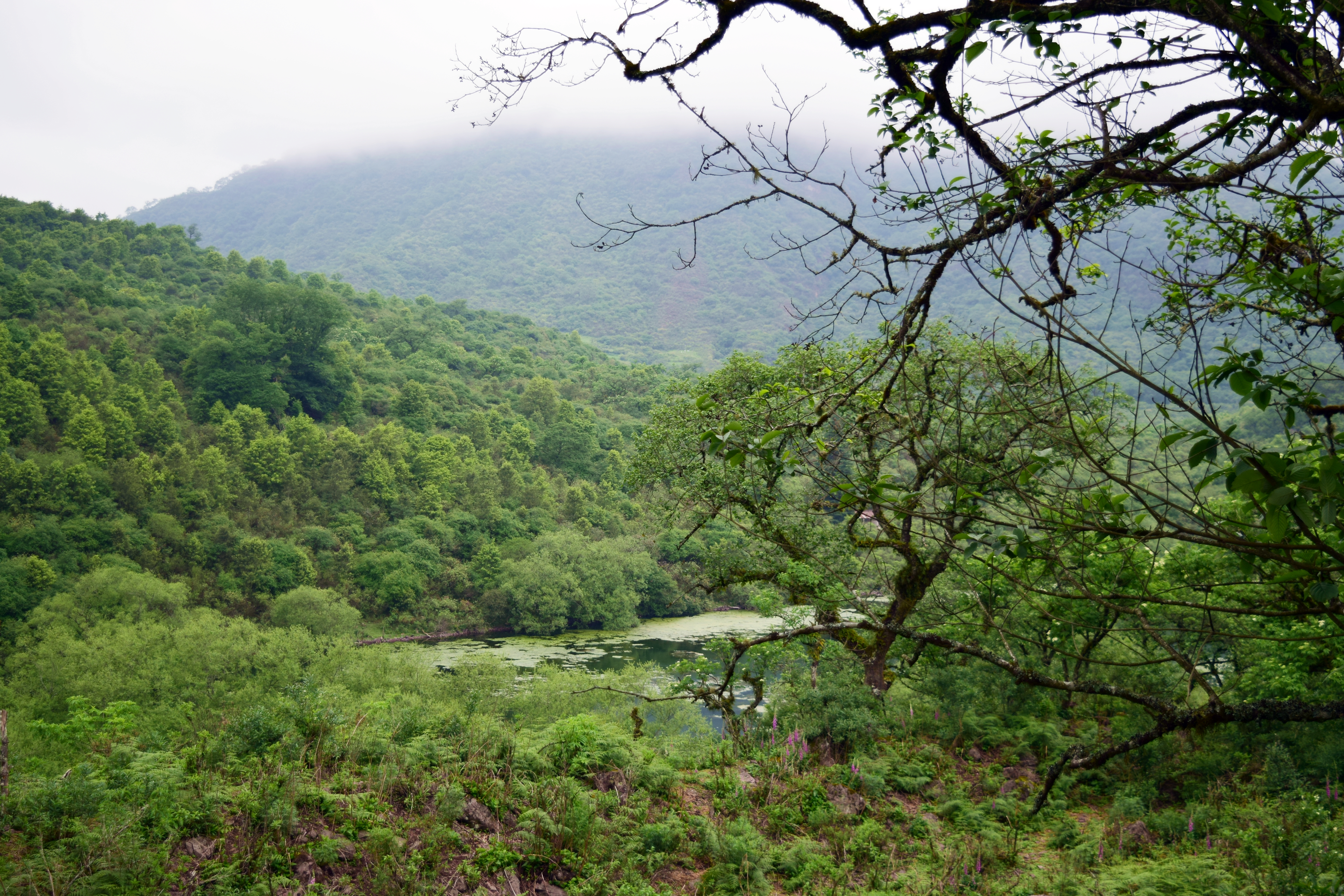
- Campo de Piedra Pómez Nevado Ojos del Salado Serranía de Hornocal Tucumán Government Palace High Monte Southern Andean Yungas

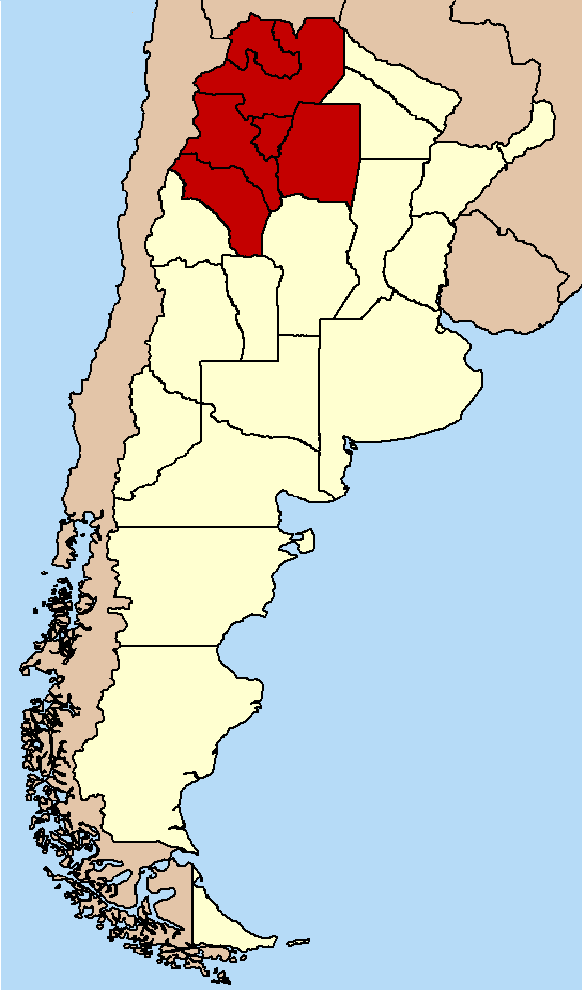
- Location of the Argentine Northwest
- Country: Argentina
- Natural regions: High Monte; Southern Andean Yungas; Central Andean dry puna; Gran Chaco; Southern Andean steppe
- Provinces: Salta; Tucumán; Jujuy; La Rioja; Santiago del Estero; Catamarca
- Largest cities: Tucumán; Salta; Santiago del Estero; San Salvador

Area
  - Total: 330,037 sq mi (854,791 km^{2})

Population (2022)
  - Total: 5,838,756
  - Density: 17.6912/sq mi (6.83062/km^{2})
- Demonym: Northerner

The Argentine Northwest (Spanish: Noroeste argentino, NOA) is a geographic and socio-economic region of Argentina comprising the provinces of Catamarca, Jujuy, La Rioja, Salta, Santiago del Estero and Tucumán. It borders Bolivia to the north, Chile to the west, the Northeast region to the east, and the Cuyo and Pampean regions to the south and southeast.

The region encompasses contrasting ecoregions and topographies, ranging from the high-altitude arid plateau of the Puna and the Andean ranges in the west to the subtropical montane forests of the Yungas and the semi-arid Chaco plains in the east. Major hydrological systems in the region include the Salí-Dulce, Bermejo and Pilcomayo river basins.

According to the 2022 census by INDEC (National Institute of Statistics and Censuses), the combined population of the provinces was 5,859,115, representing approximately 12.7% of the national total. San Miguel de Tucumán is the region's most populous city, followed by Salta, San Salvador de Jujuy and Santiago del Estero.

Economically, the region relies on agriculture (notably sugarcane, tobacco, citrus, and viticulture), mining (including lithium extraction in the high Puna), and tourism. Its geography makes it a key cross-border transit corridor linking Argentina with Bolivia and Chile.

Prior to Spanish colonization, it was inhabited by indigenous groups including the Diaguita, Calchaquí, and Omaguaca, and later incorporated into the Inca Empire. It was among the first areas colonized in what is now the Argentine territory and was the site of some of the earliest cities founded. During the colonial period, as part of the Gobernación del Tucumán, it served as the primary supply corridor for the Potosí mining complex. The region played a central role during the Argentine War of Independence, hosting pivotal campaigns and the Declaration of Independence in Tucumán in 1816.

Historically marked by regional economic disparities compared to the Pampean region, the Argentine Northwest remains a primary center of Argentine cultural heritage, particularly in traditional music, folklore, crafts, and gastronomy, shaped by a distinct synthesis of indigenous and Spanish traditions.

== Geography ==
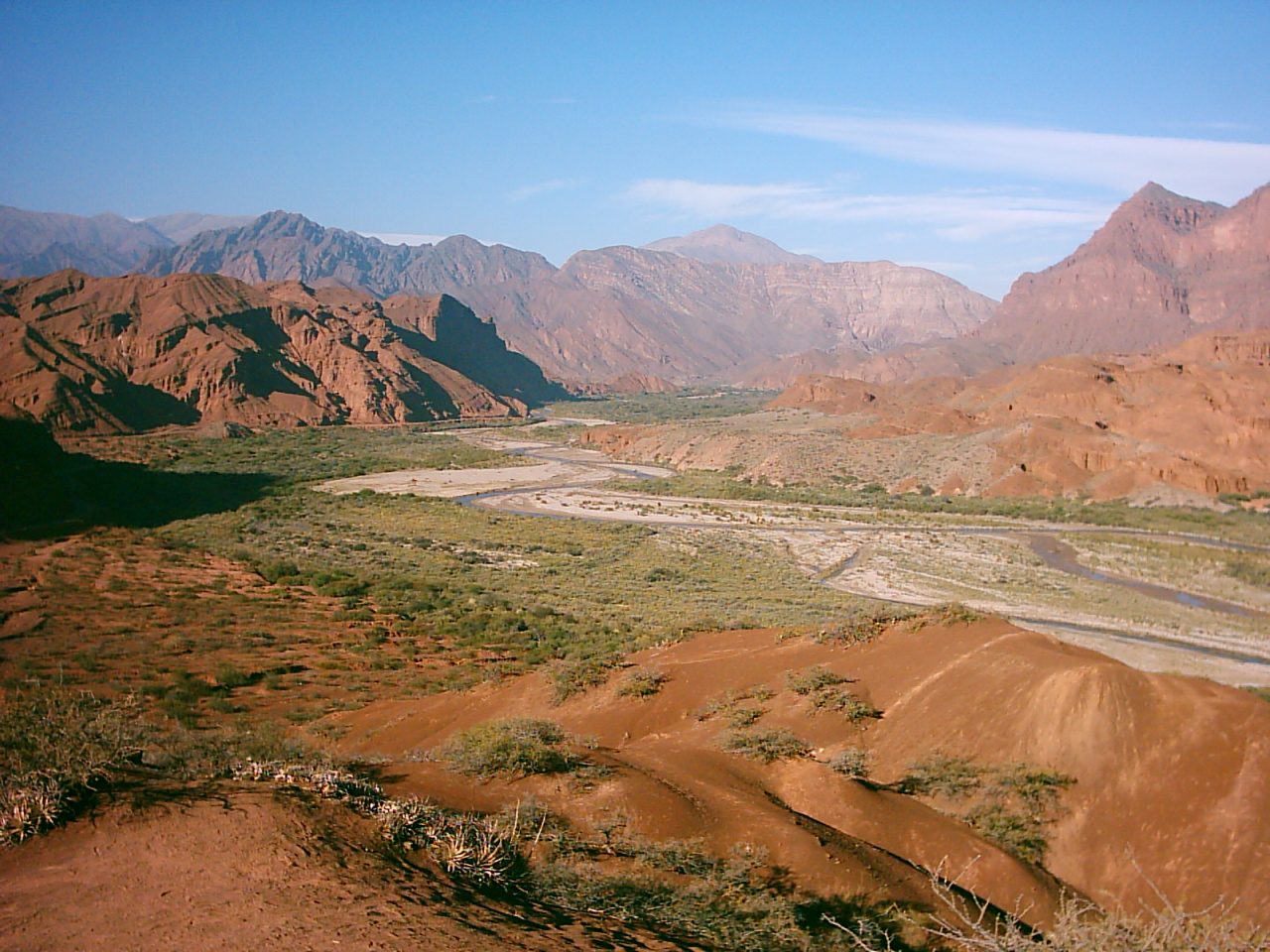
The Calchaquí Valley, Salta.

The Argentine Northwest comprises very distinct biomes, or geographical and climatic regions. From west to east they are:

- The Altiplano or "Puna"
- High Mountains of the Andes
- Fertile valleys
- Red-rock canyons and mountain passes
- Humid Sub-Andean Sierras
- Tropical jungles or Yungas
- And the ecotone—or transitional zone—between the Yungas and the Chaco region.

Besides the Yungas jungle on the eastern fringe of the region, the only fertile lands are those near the river basins, which have been irrigated extensively. Across millennia the erosive forces of these rivers has gradually created a multitude of red-rock canyons, such as the Quebrada de Humahuaca and the Valles Calchaquíes.

West of these valleys the peaks of the Andes reach heights of over 6,000 metres (20,000 ft) and the Altiplano, an extensive 3,500-meter high plateau, dominates the landscape and continues far north into Bolive and Southern Peru.

== History ==
=== Archaeological finds ===
In February 2021, archaeologists from the University of Buenos Aires–National Scientific and Technical Research Council announced the discovery of 12 graves dated to 6,000-1,300 years ago. Researchers also revealed necklaces and pendants next to some of the bodies. According to archaeologist Leticia Cortés, there were many kinds of burial methods, in individual or collective graves, and also in the posture of the bodies. Some were hyperflexed, like squatting, with the shoulders touching the knees.

== Climate ==
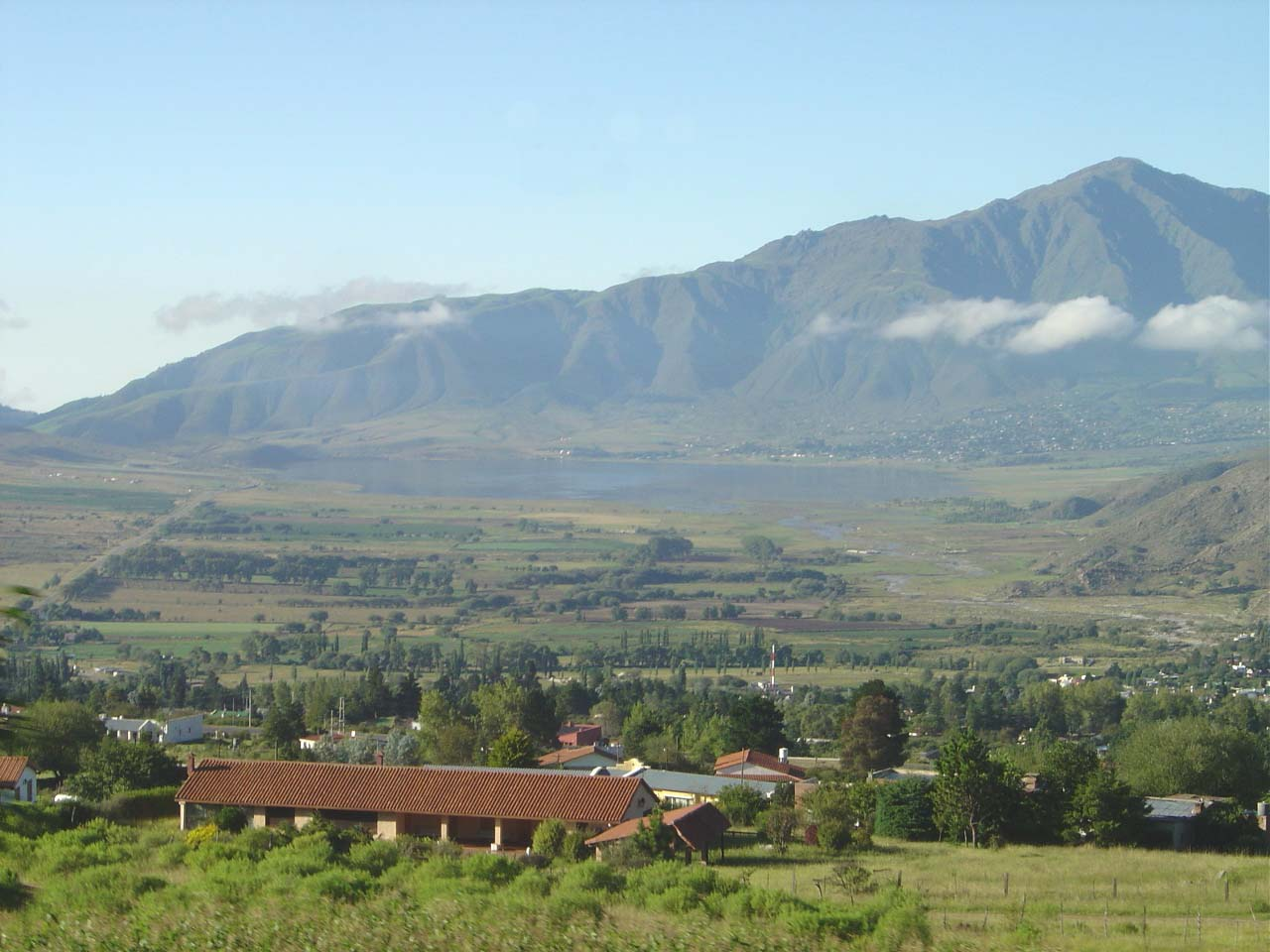
The Tafí Valley, Tucumán.

Northwest Argentina is predominantly dry and hot and classified as subtropical. Owing to its rugged topography, the region is climatically diverse, depending on the elevation, temperature and distribution of precipitation. Consequentially, the vegetation will differ at these different climate types. In general, the climate can be divided into 2 main types: a cold arid or semi-arid climate at the higher elevations and warmer subtropical climate in the eastern parts of the region. Under the Köppen climate classification, the region has 5 different climate types which are semi–arid (BS), arid (BW), temperate climate without a dry season and with a dry season (Cf and CW respectively) and an alpine climate at the highest elevations.

The atmospheric circulation is controlled by the two semi–permanent South Atlantic and South Pacific highs, and a seasonal low-pressure system east of the Andes (called the Chaco Low). During summer, the interaction between the South Atlantic high and the Chaco low causes the low-pressure system to bring northeasterly and easterly winds that carry moisture to the region, particularly in the northern parts. The movement of moist air into the region during the summer results in very high precipitation. Most of the moisture comes from the east since the Andes block any moisture from the Pacific Ocean. Cold fronts that travel northwards to the region can produce precipitation during the summer months and is more prominent in the southern parts of the region. For example, in Tucumán Province, these cold fronts are responsible for 70% of the rainfall in that province. In contrast, during the winter months, the Chaco low attracts air masses from the South Pacific high, creating a dry and cold wind. This effect is more prominent in the winter months, when the intensity of the cold is more stronger. The Intertropical Convergence Zone reaches the region during the summer months, leading to low pressure, and unstable air masses due to the relatively high land temperatures compared to the sea during this season. This leads to enhanced precipitation in the form of convective thunderstorms during the summer months. During the winter months, the Intertropical Convergence Zone moves northwards to Ecuador while both the South Pacific and South Atlantic high move northwards, and the Chaco low weakens, all of which result in the suppression of rain during the winter. With the predominant wind being from the west and the Andes blocking most rain bearing clouds from the Pacific Ocean along with atmospheric circulation patterns unfavourable for rain, this results in a dry season during winter. At the highest elevations, westerly winds from the Pacific Ocean can penetrate during the winter months, leading to snowstorms.

=== Precipitation ===
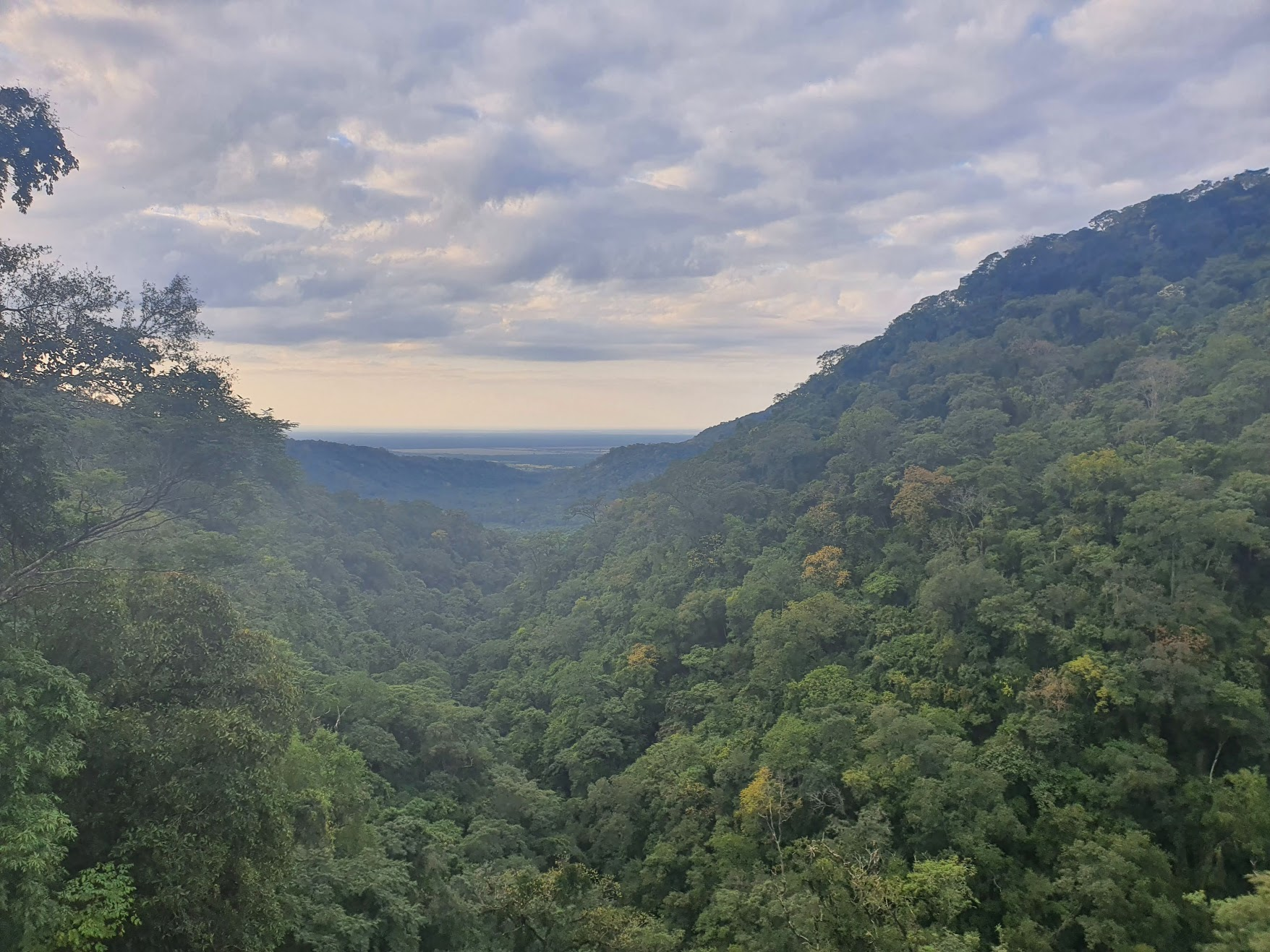
The Acambuco Provincial Reserve in the Yungas.

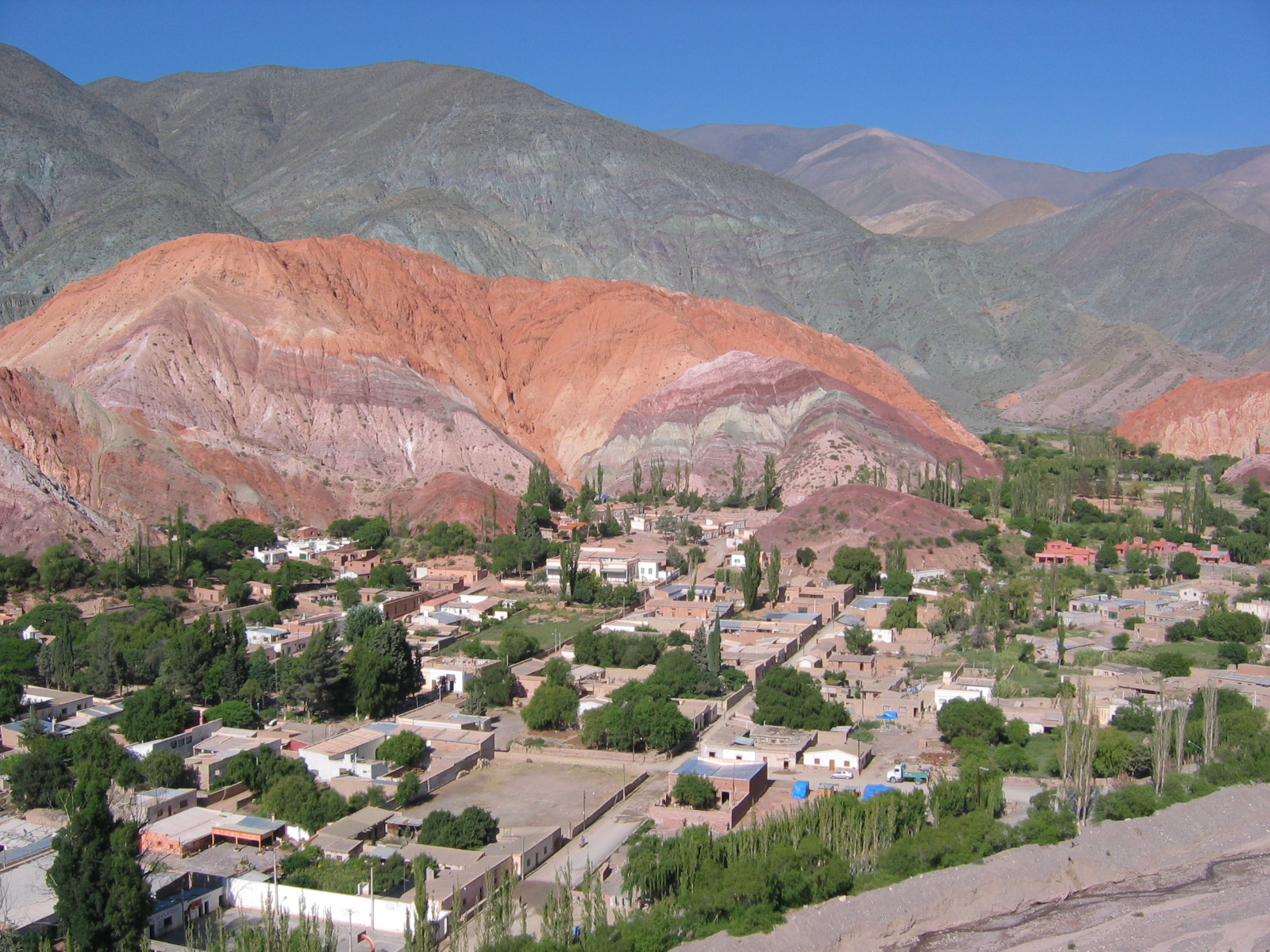
Cerro de los Siete Colores next to Purmamarca, Jujuy.

Precipitation in the region is highly seasonal and is mostly concentrated in the summer months, during which precipitation decreases from east to west. Precipitation is distributed irregularly owing to relief. As moist air reaches the eastern slopes of the mountains, this moist air raises up vertically, cooling adiabatically, leading to the formation of clouds which generate copious amounts of rain. The eastern slopes of the mountains can receive between 1,000 and 1,500 mm (39 and 59 in) of precipitation a year although some places can receive 2,500 mm (98 in) of precipitation per year owing to orographic precipitation. In the south, the orographic effect is enhanced by advancing cold fronts from the south, resulting in enhanced precipitation. The high rainfall on these first slopes creates a thick jungle that extends in a narrow strip along these ranges. Beyond the first slopes of the Andes into the valleys, the air descends vertically, warming adiabatically, creating air that is drier and warmer than on the eastern slopes. Since the mountain ranges are oriented in a north–south direction, increase in elevation to the west, and have a discontinuous orography, this allows valleys to have regions of relatively high precipitation in the west and drier regions in eastern parts of the valleys through orographic precipitation.

In the temperate valleys, which include major cities such as Salta and Jujuy, (Note: According to the Instituto Nacional de Tecnología Agropecuaria, the temperate valleys include the Lerma Valley, Siancas Valley in Salta Province and the Pericos Valley and the temperate valleys of Jujuy, which includes the 2 provincial capitals) average precipitation ranges from 500 to 1,000 mm (20 to 39 in). For example, in the Lerma Valley which is surrounded by tall mountains (only the northeastern part of the valley is surrounded by shorter mountains), precipitation ranges from 695 mm (27.4 in) in Salta to 1,395 mm (54.9 in) in San Lorenzo, just 11 km (6.8 mi) away. Rainfall in the Lerma valley in Salta and in wetter valleys in Jujuy province, including its provincial capital, is mainly concentrated in the summer months and falls in short but heavy bursts.

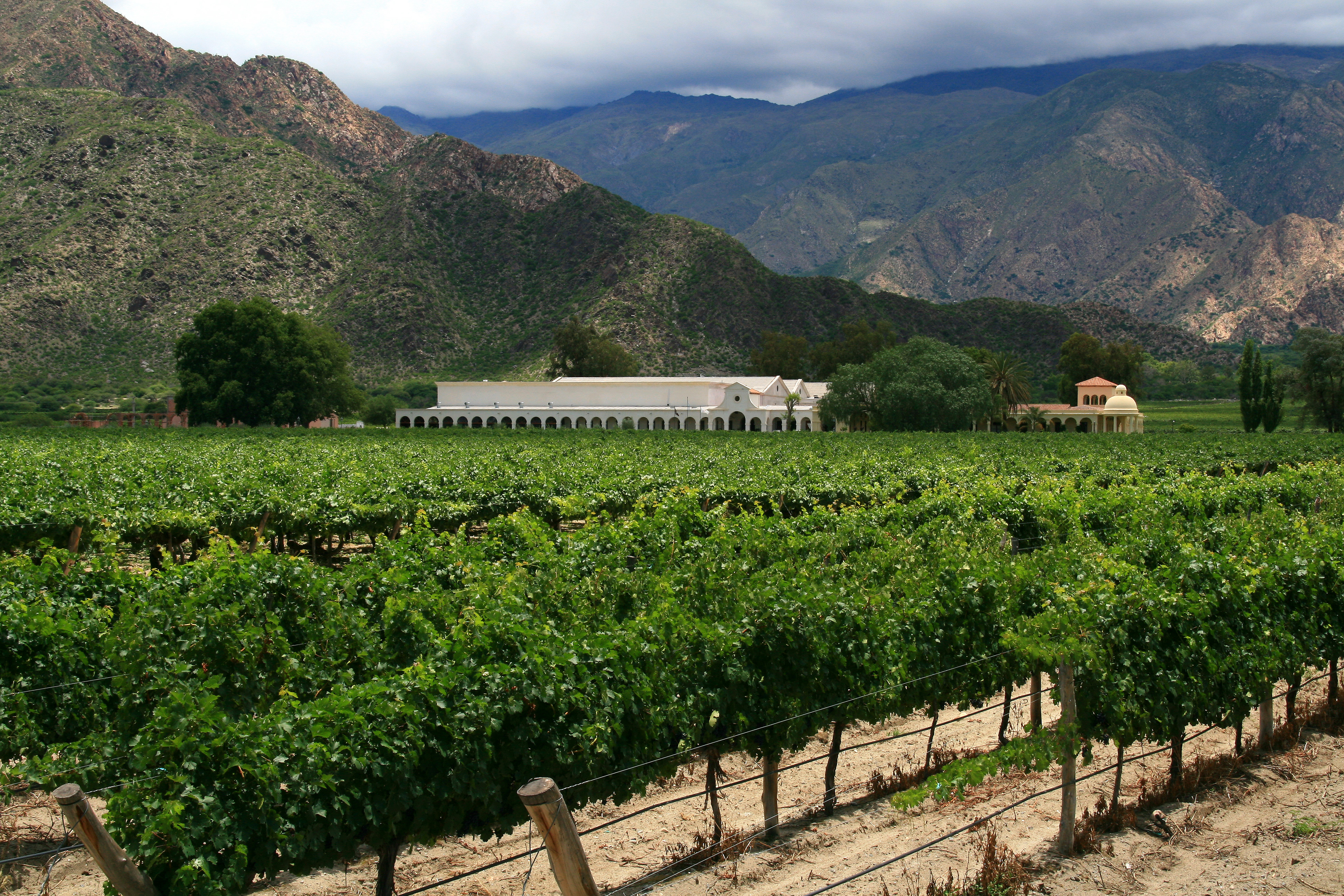
A winery located between the mountains in Cafayate.

Valleys in the southern parts of the region are drier than northern valleys due to the mountains on the eastern slopes of both the Andes and the Sierras Pampeanas being taller than the ones in the north (ranging from 3,000 to 6,900 m (9,800 to 22,600 ft)), presenting a significant orographic barrier that blocks moist winds from the Atlantic and Pacific oceans. These valleys often receive less than 200 mm (7.9 in) of precipitation per year and are characterized by sparse vegetation adapted to the arid climate. For example, in La Rioja Province, mean annual precipitation ranges from 300 mm (12 in) in the easternmost parts to 100 mm (3.9 in) at the foot of the Andes. Similarly in Catamarca Province, the mean annual precipitation varies from 150 mm (5.9 in) in the middle of valleys between the Andes mountains to more than 300 mm (12 in) in the nearby mountain ranges which form the valleys. In Jujuy province, precipitation in the dry Quebrada de Humahuaca valley ranges from 200 to 410 mm (7.9 to 16.1 in). A similar annual precipitation is found in the dry Calchaquí Valleys, with mean annual precipitation ranging from 95 mm (3.7 in) in Molinos to 200 mm (7.9 in) in Cafayate. Further west in the Puna region next to Bolivia, the average elevation is 3,900 m (12,800 ft) and the terrain is mostly desert due to the higher elevations of the mountains on the east from both the Andes and the northwest extension of the Sierras Pampeanas, blocking most of the easterly winds from coming in.

Precipitation in the Puna region averages less than 200 mm (7.9 in) a year while potential evapotranspiration ranges from 500 to 600 mm (20 to 24 in) a year, owing to the high insolation, strong winds, and low humidity that exacerbates the dry conditions. Owing to the low precipitation in conjunction with the extreme climatic conditions, the Puna region has a water deficit in all months of the year. Although easterly winds are rare in the Puna region, they bring 88–96% of the precipitation to the area. Snowfall is rare, averaging less than 5 days of snow per year since most of the precipitation falls in the summer in the form of rain. The southeast part of the Puna region is very arid and receives the lowest annual precipitation in the region, averaging 50 mm (2.0 in). In the northeast part of the Puna region in Jujuy Province, mean annual precipitation ranges from 300 to 400 mm (12 to 16 in). Due to the aridity of these mountains at high elevations, the snowline can extend as far up as 6,000 m above sea level. The El Niño Southern Oscillation influences precipitation levels in northwest Argentina. During an El Niño year, the westerly flow is strengthened while moisture content from the east is reduced, resulting in a drier rainy season. In contrast, during a La Niña year, there is enhanced easterly moisture transport, resulting in a more intense rainy season. Nonetheless, this trend is highly variable both spatially and temporally.

=== Temperatures ===
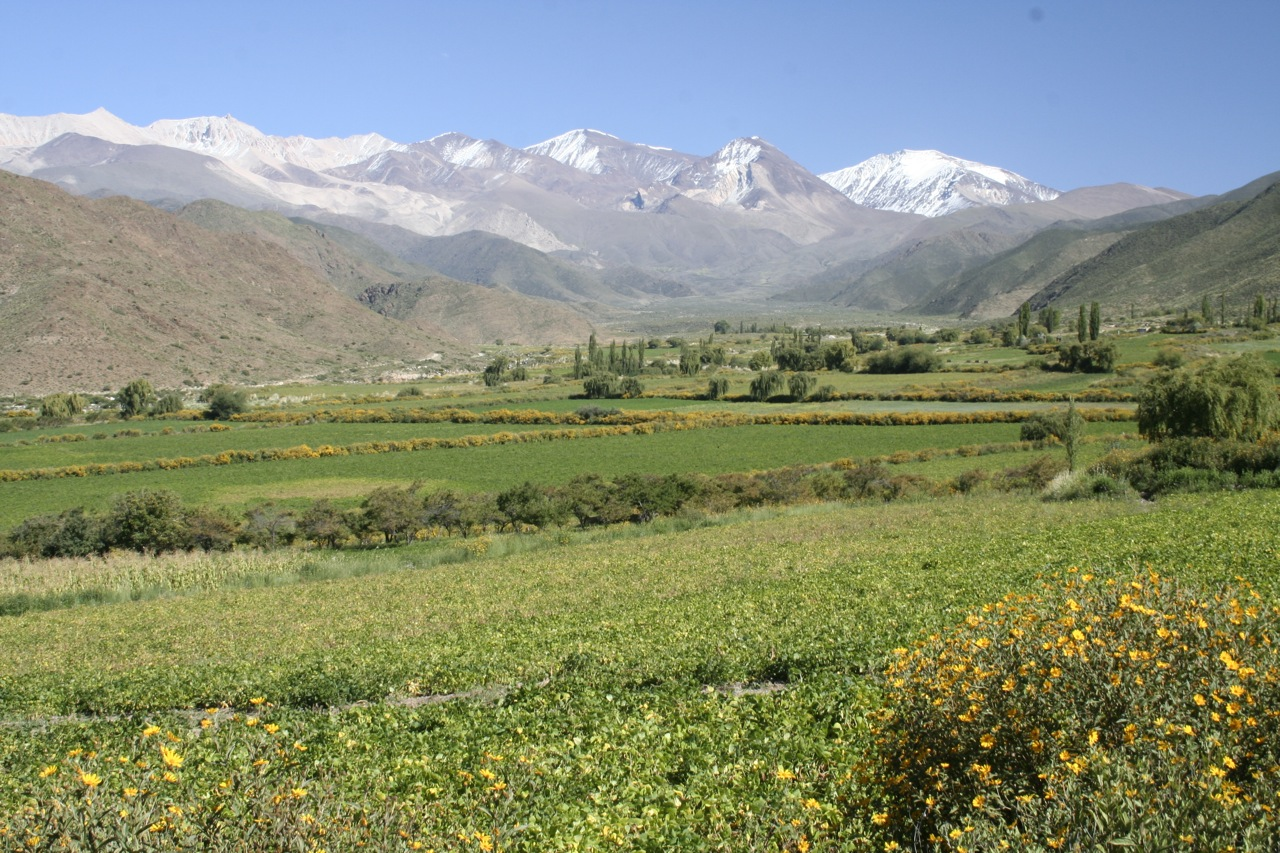
Surroundings of Cachi, Salta.

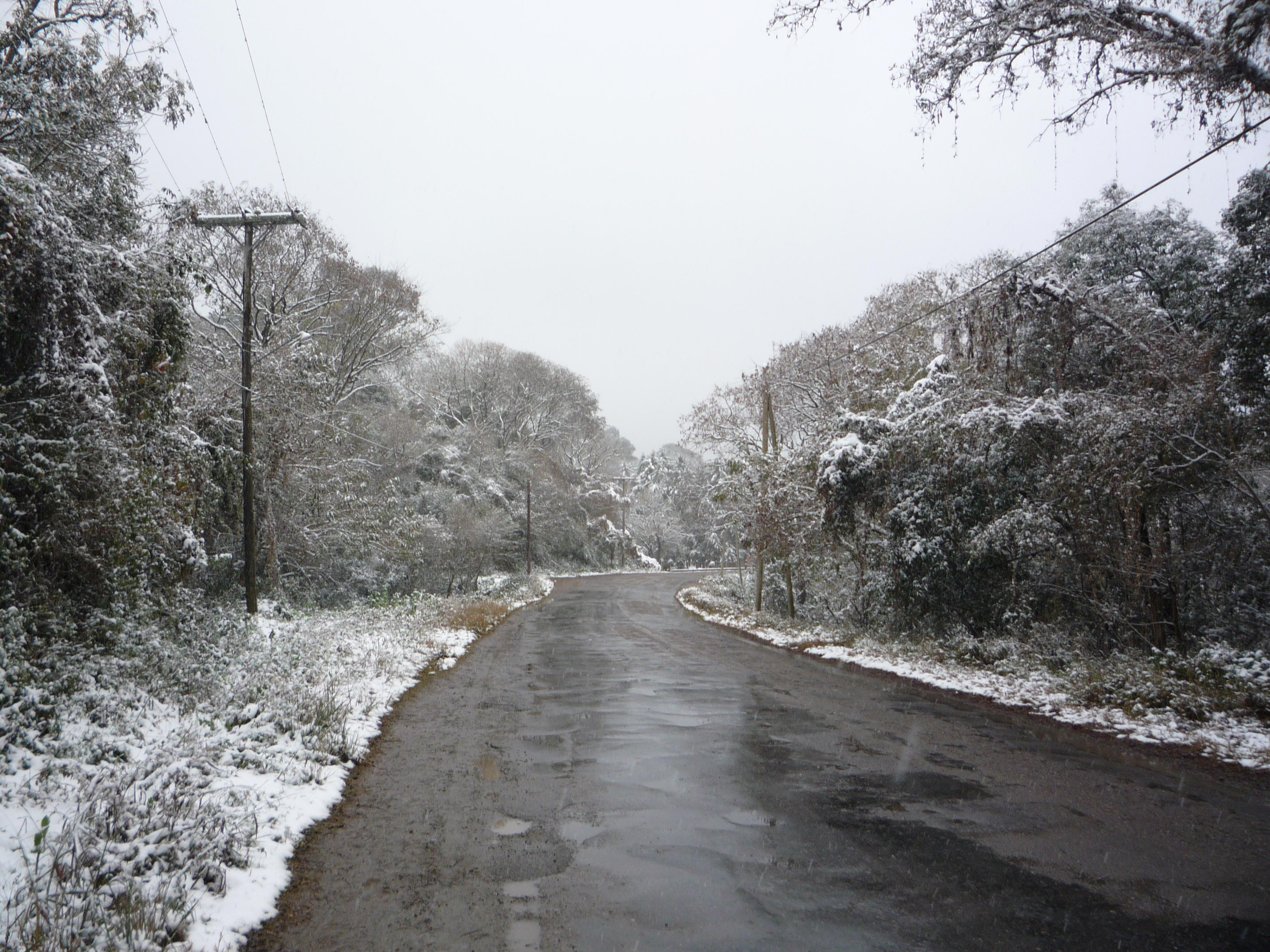
View of Provincial Route 56 in the Jujuy Province.

Temperatures in northwest Argentina vary with elevation. In the temperate valleys which includes the cities of Salta and Jujuy, they have a temperate climate, with mild temperatures in the summer (a mean of 20 °C (68.0 °F) in Salta, 21 °C (69.8 °F) in Jujuy in January) and extremely dry and cool winters with regular frosts (a mean of 10 °C (50.0 °F) in Salta and 10.5 °C (50.9 °F) in Jujuy in July). The diurnal range in these cities is fairly large, particularly in the winter.

In the Quebrada de Humahuaca valley in Jujuy province, north of Jujuy city, the diurnal range is large with a thermal amplitude between 16 and 20 °C (28.8 and 36.0 °F). A major reason for the large thermal amplitude is that during the day, there is intense radiation from the sun, causing the land to heat up while during the night, there is less radiation, causing the land to cool and temperatures to fall down. Mean temperatures in the warmest month in the Quebrada de Humahuaca valley range from 15.1 °C (59.2 °F) in Humahuaca at the higher elevations to 18.5 °C (65.3 °F) in Volcan at the lower elevations; in the coldest month, the mean temperature ranges from 7.1 to 8.1 °C (44.8 to 46.6 °F). The mean annual temperatures in the Quebrada de Humahuaca valley ranges from 12.0 to 14.1 °C (53.6 to 57.4 °F), depending on elevation. In the Calchaquí Valleys in Salta province, the climate is similar to the valleys in La Rioja province and Catamarca province, by being temperate and arid with large thermal amplitudes, long summers, and a long frost free period which varies depending on elevation. Mean temperatures in the warmest month in the Calchaqui valleys range from 14.5 °C (58.1 °F) at the higher elevations to 22.1 °C (71.8 °F) at lower elevations; in the coldest month, the mean temperature ranges from 4.8 to 9.6 °C (40.6 to 49.3 °F). The mean annual temperatures in the Calchaqui valleys ranges from 10.2 °C (50.4 °F) in La Poma at the higher elevations to 16.9 °C (62.4 °F) in San Carlos which lies at a lower elevation. In both the Quebrada de Humahuaca and Calchaqui valleys, winters are cold with frosts that can occur between March and September.

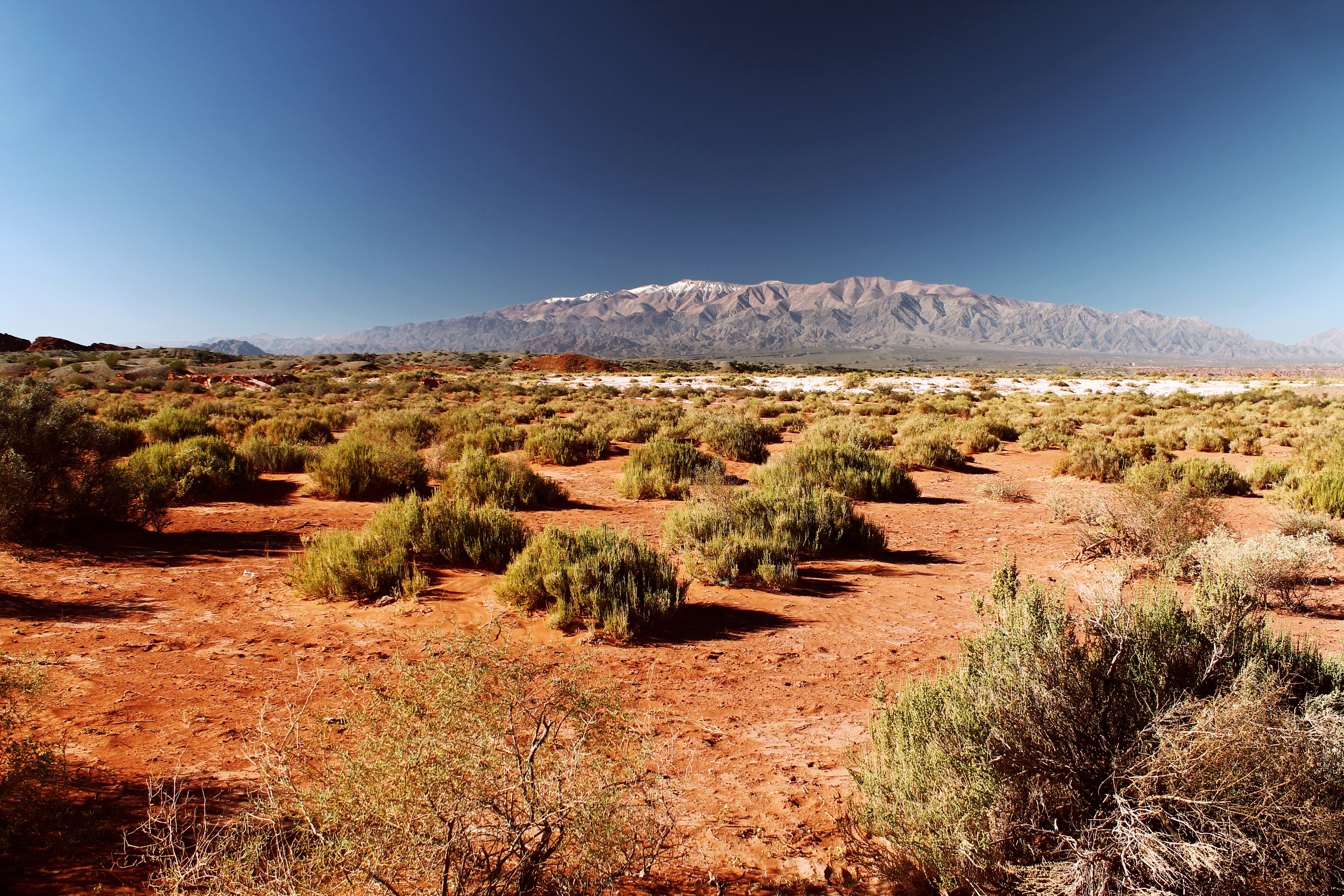
View of Nevado de Famatina.

In the valleys in the south in La Rioja province and Catamarca province along with the southwest parts of Santiago del Estero Province which is part of the arid Chaco ecoregion, the climate is mild year long in terms of temperature. Temperatures during the summer are very high, with a mean temperature of 26 °C (78.8 °F) in January, the warmest month. Temperatures can exceed 40 °C (104.0 °F) on an average of 20–25 days and can occasionally exceed 45 °C (113.0 °F), particularly in the central valley of Catamarca (Valle Central de Catamarca) and the valley of La Rioja Capital which lie at lower elevations than other valleys such as Tinogasta. Winters in the valleys of La Rioja province and Catamarca province along with southwest Santiago del Estero province are mild, with a mean temperature of 12 °C (53.6 °F). Cold fronts from the south, bringing cold Antarctic air can cause severe frosts in the valleys of La Rioja province and Catamarca province. Temperatures can fall between −8 and −14 °C (17.6 and 6.8 °F) during these cold fronts. In contrast, the Zonda wind, which occurs more during the winter months can affect these valleys in La Rioja province and Catamarca province can raise temperatures up to 35 °C (95.0 °F) with strong gusts, causing possible crop damage.

Further west, in the Puna region next to Bolivia, temperatures are much colder, with a mean annual temperature of less than 10 °C (50.0 °F) owing to its high elevation. The Puna region is characterized by being cold but sunny throughout the year. The diurnal range is large with a thermal amplitude that can exceed 40 °C (104.0 °F) due to the low humidity and the intense sunlight throughout the year. and the mean annual maximum and minimum temperatures are 16 °C (60.8 °F) and −4 °C (24.8 °F) respectively with frosts that can occur in any month as night temperatures can regularly fall below freezing. Absolute maximum temperatures in the Puna region can reach up to 30 °C (86.0 °F) while absolute minimum temperatures can fall below −20 °C (−4.0 °F).

In Tucumán Province, the eastern parts have an average annual temperature of 18 to 20 °C (64.4 to 68.0 °F). Summers are hot with mean temperatures averaging between 24 and 26 °C (75.2 and 78.8 °F) while in winter, the mean temperatures are between 10 and 12 °C (50.0 and 53.6 °F). Easternmost parts of the province, which borders the Chaco region are home to the highest and lowest temperatures in the province where absolute maximum temperatures can exceed 40 °C (104.0 °F) while absolute minimum temperatures can reach close to −7 °C (19.4 °F) owing to the accumulation of cold air that descends from the mountains. At higher elevations, the climate is cooler with summer temperatures averaging 20 °C (68.0 °F) and winter temperatures averaging 10 °C (50.0 °F). The annual temperature in the higher elevations is between 12 and 14 °C (53.6 and 57.2 °F) at an elevation of 2,500 metres (8,202.1 ft) above sea level. Within the valleys located between the mountains, temperatures are cooler with a mean annual temperature of 13.1 °C (55.6 °F) (summers average 17.1 °C (62.8 °F) while winters average 9.0 °C (48.2 °F)) in the Tafi valley.

== Economy ==
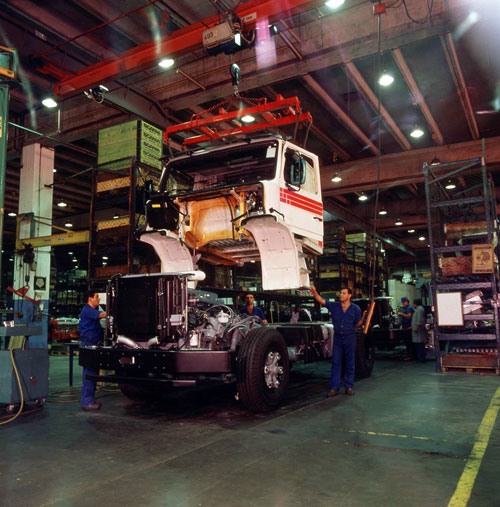
Scania AB factory in San Miguel de Tucumán.

The majority of the population—and thus economic activity—of this region is concentrated in the many fertile valleys. In these valleys, the cultivation of sugarcane, tobacco, and citrus is the most important activity, along with cattle and goat raising. Important vineyards are also found in the Valles Calchaquíes in the Cafayate region.

Thus most economic activity is associated with agriculture, with the exception of the "Altos Hornos Zapla" steel furnace.

Mining includes lithium, lead, silver, zinc and salt, and hydrocarbons extraction.

== Tourism ==
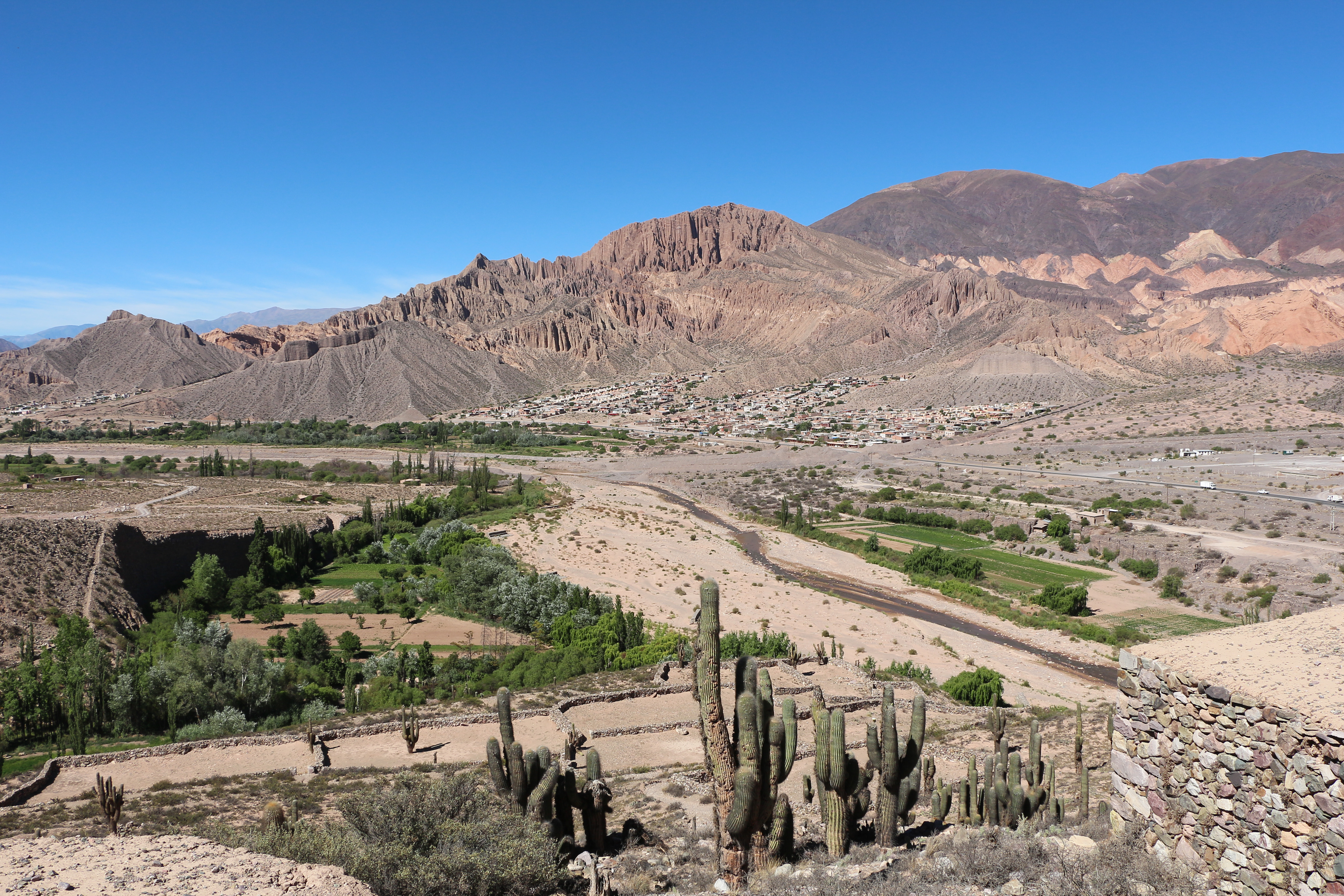
The Quebrada de Humahuaca, a UNESCO World Heritage Site.

The Argentine Northwest is a popular destination for both domestic and international travelers, attracting neighboring Argentinos and vacationing Europeans alike. Some of the most popular destination are Quebrada de Humahuaca and the Cerro de los Siete Colores, Cafayate and the Valles Calchaquíes, Tafí del Valle, and the capital cities of the provinces: San Miguel de Tucumán, San Fernando del Valle de Catamarca, Salta and San Salvador de Jujuy.

The national parks of the region are: Baritú National Park, Calilegua National Park, El Rey National Park, Los Cardones National Park and Campo de los Alisos National Park.

=== Cultural tourism ===
In addition to the geography of the area, the culture is also of great interest. It is heavily influenced by Spanish, Diaguita and Qulla cultures, and the region is quite distinct from the rest of Argentina which is predominantly European. This influence can be seen in the music, clothing and customs of the town.

== See also ==
- Regions of Argentina
- 1948 Salta earthquake
