= Humahuaca Department =

Coordinates: 23.2025°S 65.3486°W

Humahuaca
- Department
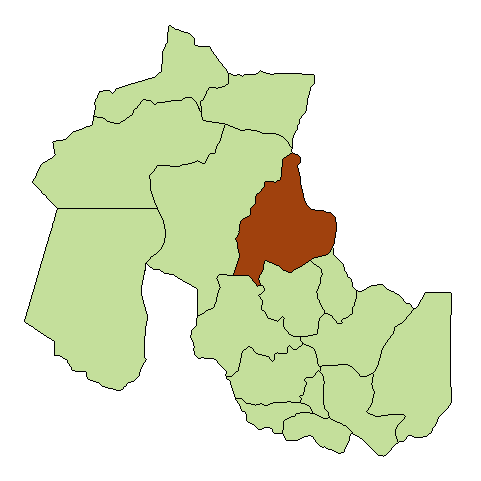
- Country: Argentina
- Province: Jujuy

Area
  - Total: 3,792 km^{2} (1,464 sq mi)

Population (2022)
  - Total: 20,914
  - Density: 5.515/km^{2} (14.28/sq mi)

Humahuaca Department is a department located in the Jujuy Province of Argentina. Its capital city is Humahuaca. Part of the Quebrada de Humahuaca extends through the length of the department.

== Size, borders and access ==
Humahuaca Department has a surface area of 3,792 square kilometres (1,464 mi^{2}), and as of the 2010 census had a population density of 4.6 inhabitants per square kilometer. The department is bordered on the east by the province of Salta, on the west by Cochinoca Department, and on the south by the Tumbaya, Tilcara, and Valle Grande Departments.

The primary means of accessing the department is via National Route 9.
