= Serranía de Hornocal =

Mountain range in Argentina

Coordinates: 23°16′S 65°07′W

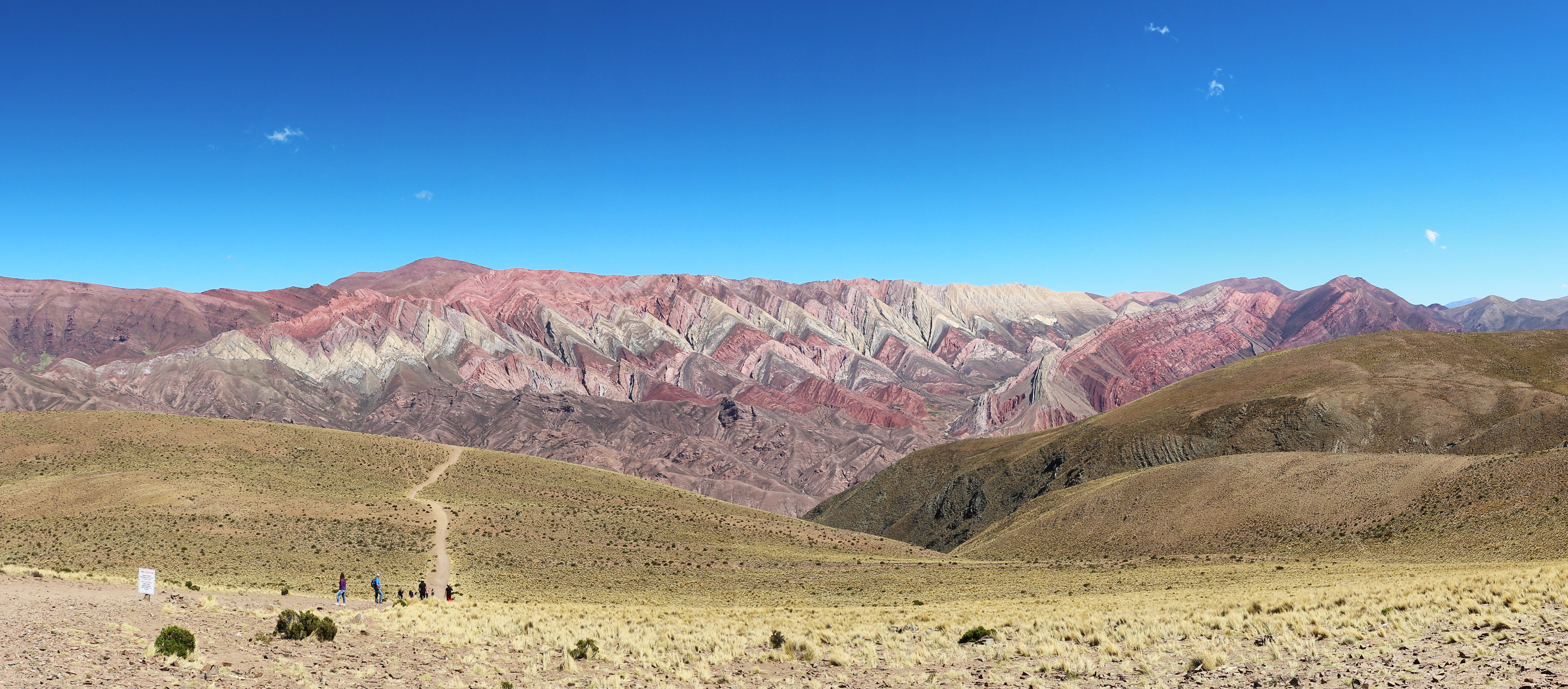
Serranía de Hornocal.

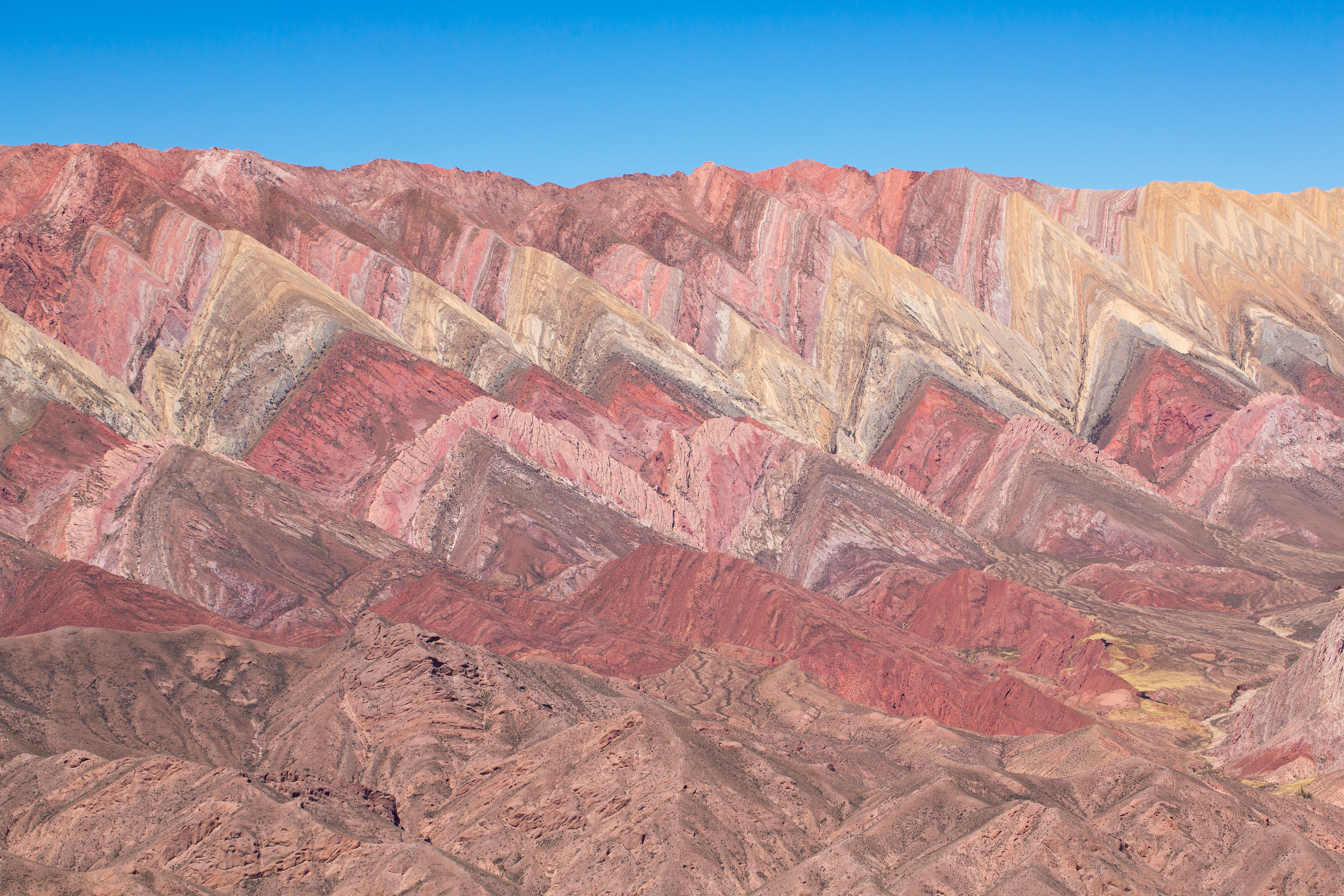
Serranía de Hornocal.

The Serranía de Hornocal are a range of mountains located 25 kilometres (16 mi) from the city of Humahuaca in the Argentine province of Jujuy. Exposed in the range is the limestone formation called Yacoraite that extends from Salta, Argentina, through the Argentine Quebrada de Humahuaca, and then through the Bolivian Altiplano to Peru.

The mountains reach an altitude of 4,761 metres (15,620 ft) above sea level.

The region Quebrada de Humahuaca was declared a World Heritage Site in 2003, both for its colorful mountain landscapes and the historic Inca caravan road running through the region.
