= Cerro de los Siete Colores =

Mountain in Argentina

- Hill of Seven Colors
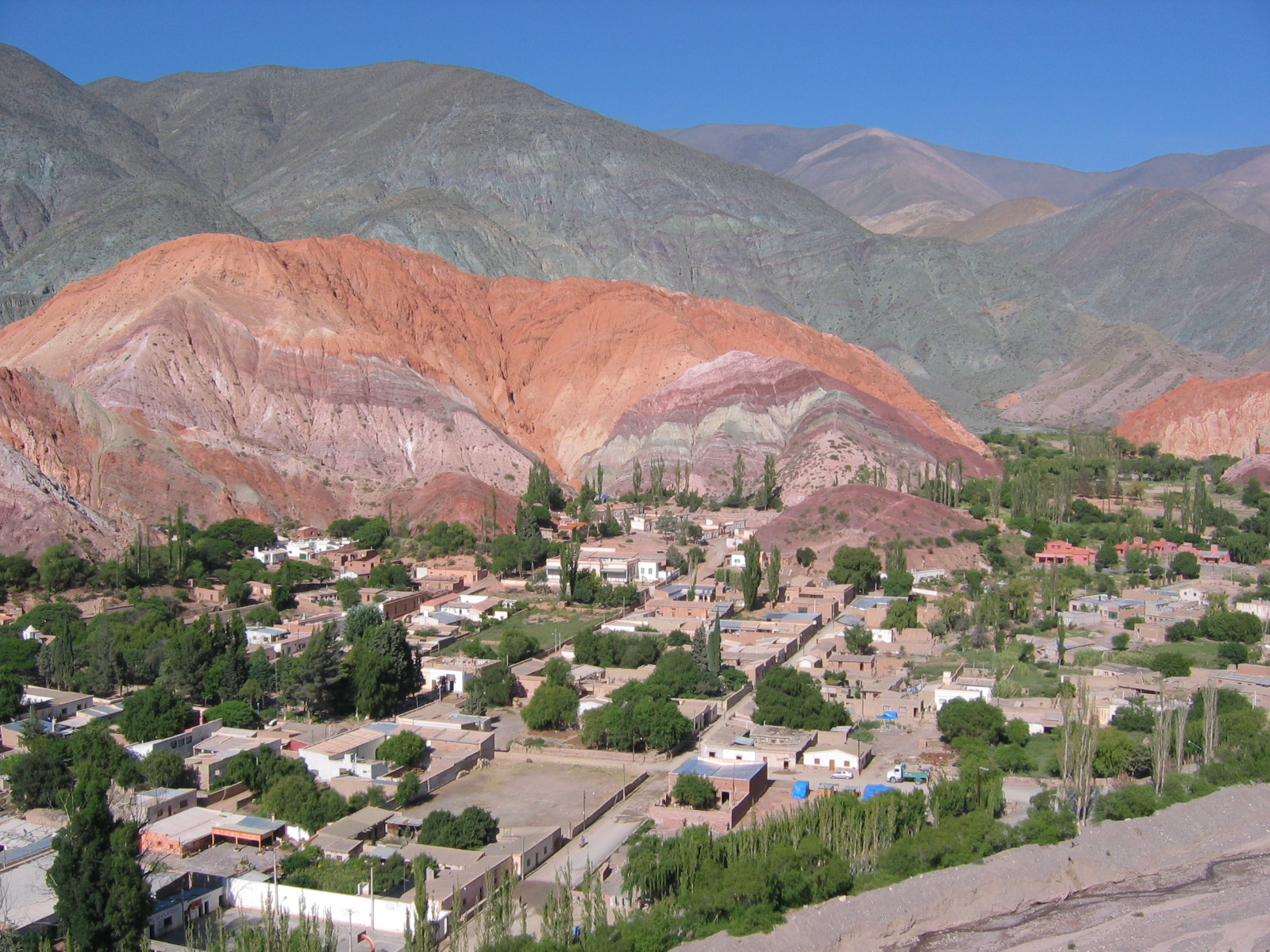

Highest point
- Coordinates: 23°44′49″S 65°30′13″W

Geography
- Location within Argentina
- Location: Purmamarca, Jujuy Province, Argentina
- Parent range: Andes

Cerro de los Siete Colores (The Hill of Seven Colors) is one of the hills bordering the Quebrada de Purmamarca which is in turn is a western branch of the Quebrada de Humahuaca up to Cuesta del Lipán, in Jujuy Province, Argentina.
Its unique color range is the product of a complex geological history including marine sediments, lake and river movements elevated with the movement of the tectonic plates. Evidence of this history can be seen in the numerous fossils found at the site.

The village of Purmamarca is located at the base of Cerro de los Siete Colores .

At the base of the mountain sits a football field, the home ground of the Santa Rosa de Purmamarca football club, part of the Quebradeña Football League.

In 2024, the Argentinian Ministry of Foreign Affairs worked with a video game studio to build a recreation of the Cerro de los Siete Colores in Fortnite.

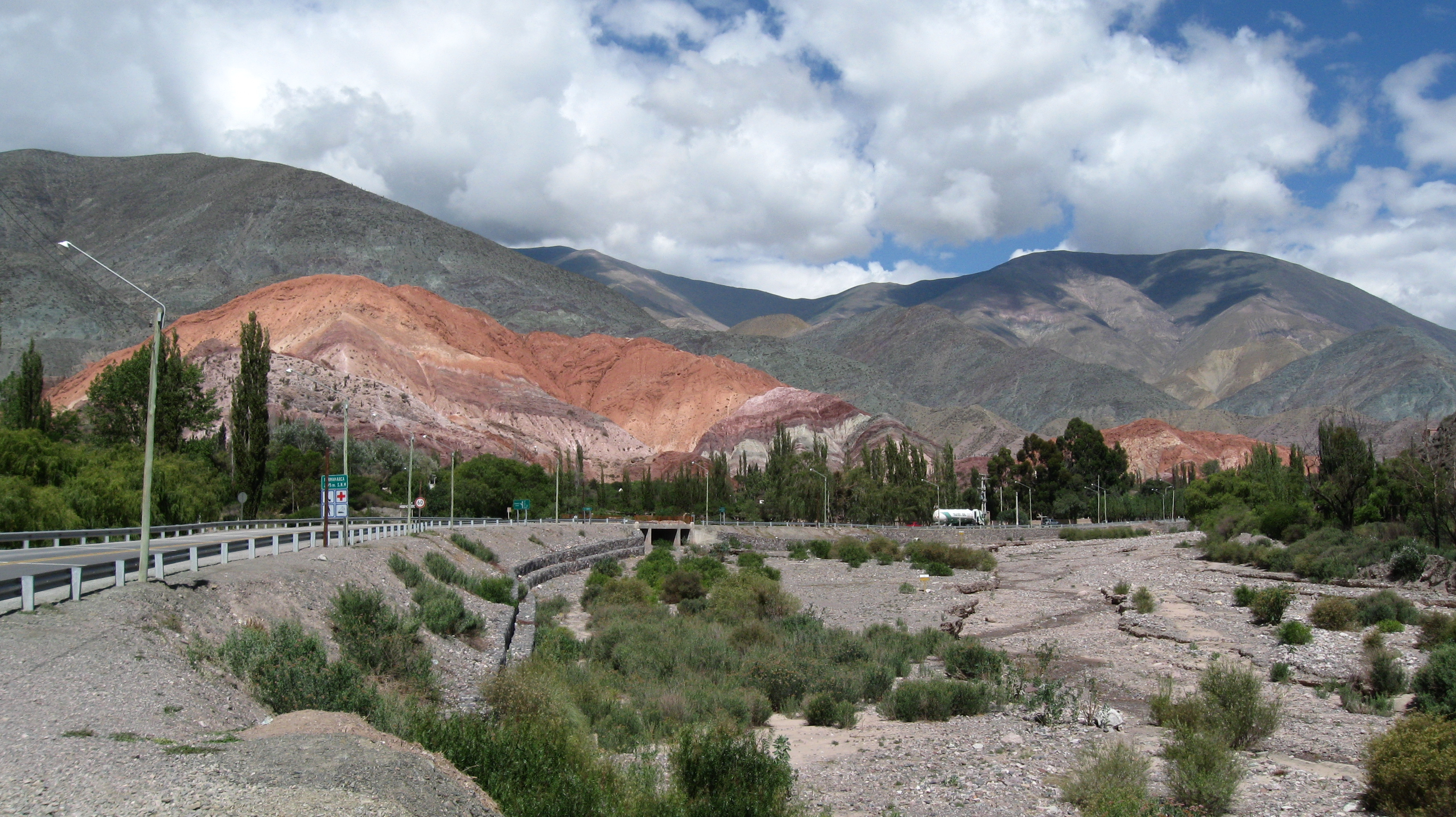
Cerro de los siete colores, view from the road

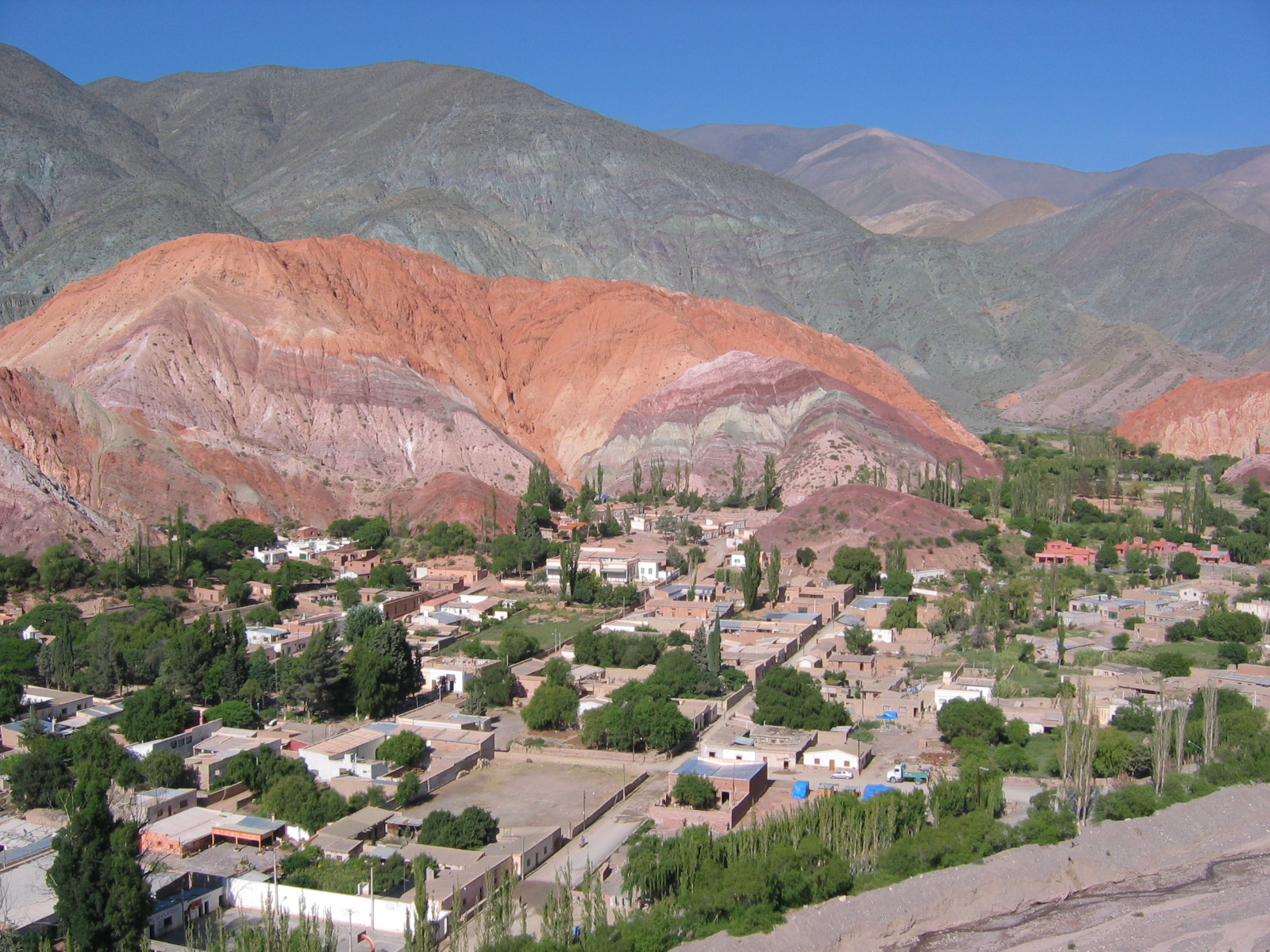
Cerro de los siete colores, aerial view

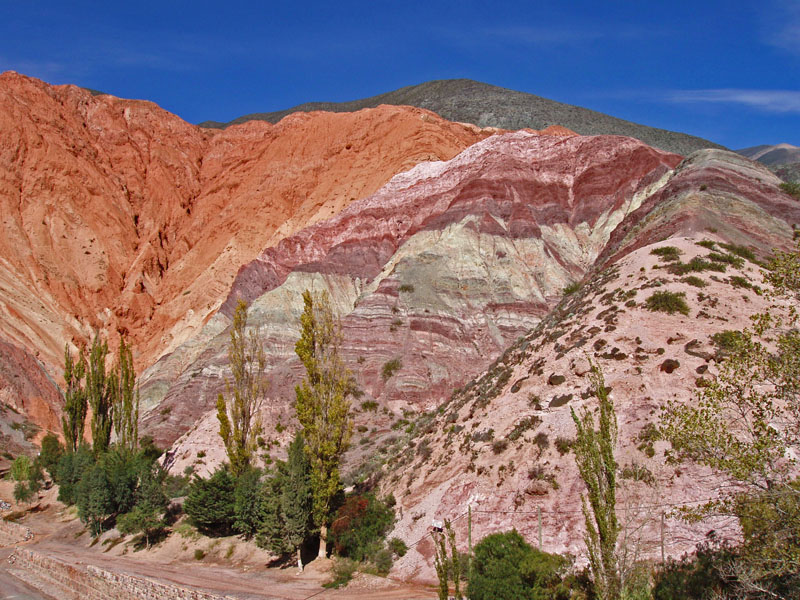
Side view

== See also ==
- Purmamarca
- Quebrada de Humahuaca
- Pucará de Tilcara
