= Purmamarca =

- Locality
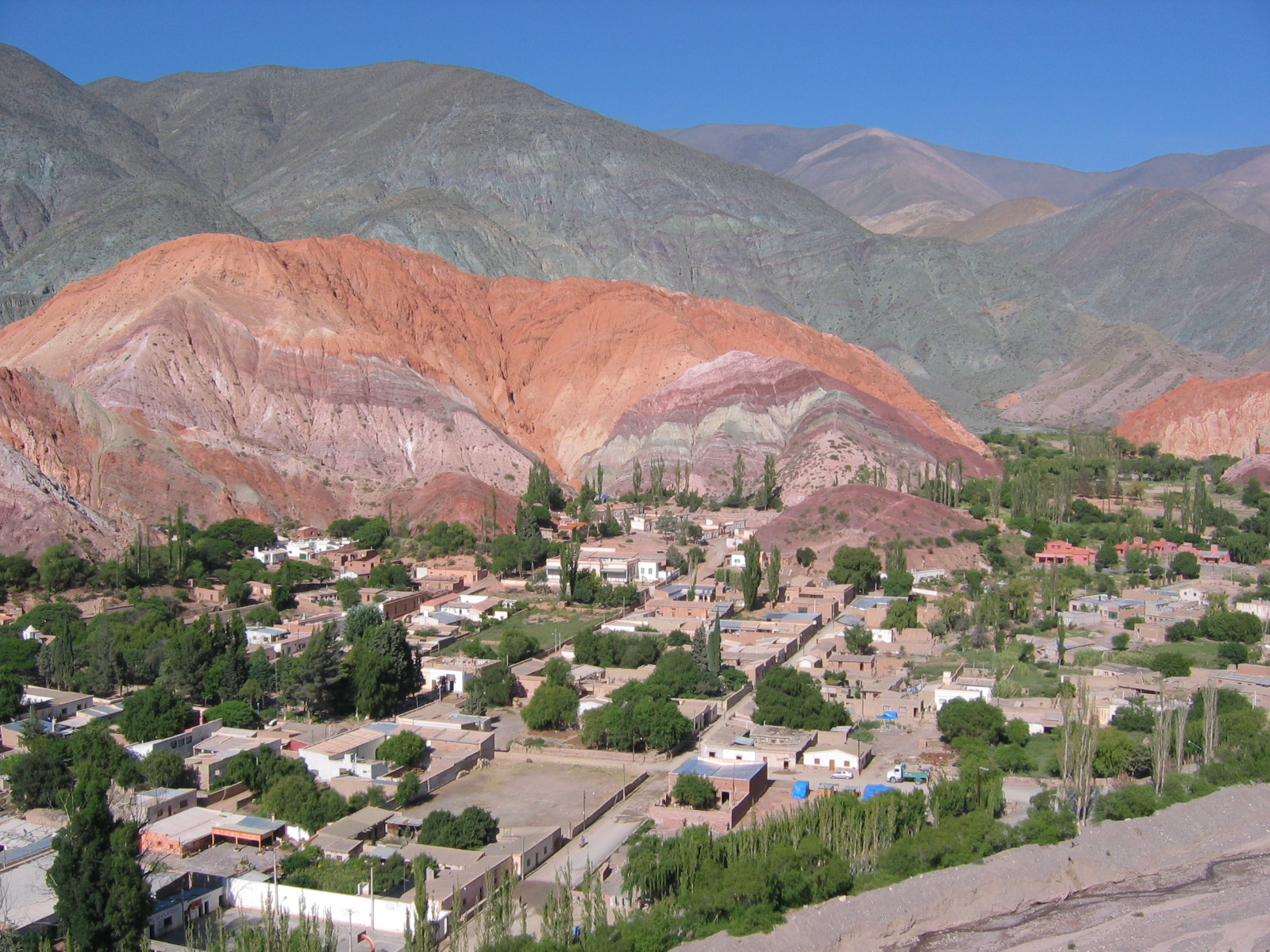

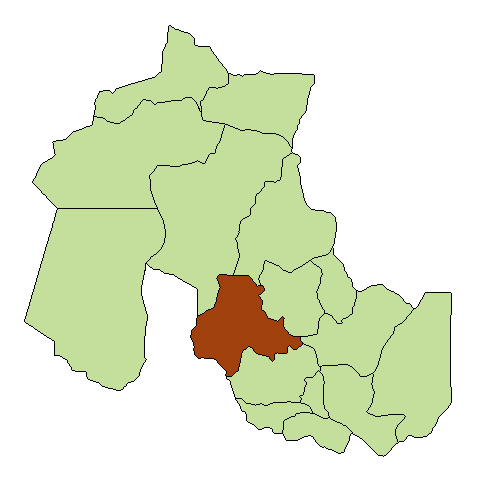
- Location of the Tumbaya Department
- Coordinates: 23°44′00″S 65°29′00″W
- Country: Argentina
- Province: Jujuy Province
- Department: Tumbaya Department

Government
  - Intendente: José Humberto López
- Elevation: 2,324 m (7,625 ft)

Population (2001)
  - Total: 2,089
- Time zone: UTC−3 (ART)
- Postal code: Y4618

Purmamarca is a town in the Tumbaya Department of the Jujuy Province in Argentina.

== Etymology ==
The name of the town can be interpreted as the combination of Aymara language words purma (desert) and marca (city), though desert in that language can refer to uncivilised or not touched by human hand, thus the name is often interpreted as Town of the virgin land.

== History ==
The village boasts a millennial heritage and has existed since the time of the Spanish conquest.

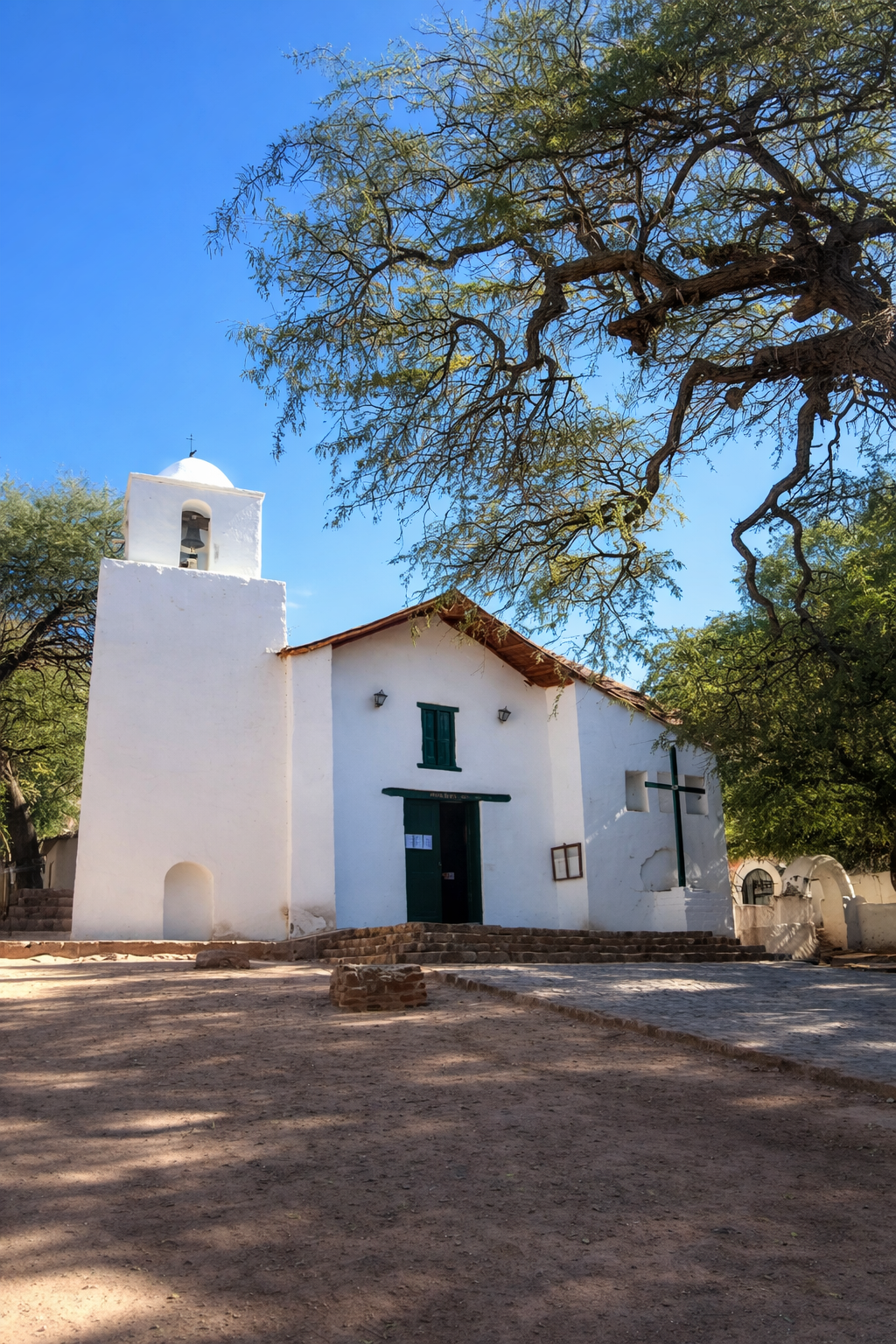
Church of Saint Rose of Lima

The church, constructed in 1648, features a striking lintel on its main entrance. Dedicated to Saint Rose of Lima, its patronal feast is celebrated on August 30th with religious ceremonies, sikuris (traditional Andean panpipe ensembles), misachicos (processions) accompanied by erkes (Andean wind instruments) and bombos (drums). Declared a National Historic Monument in 1941, the church exemplifies modest architecture: adobe walls, a roof crafted from cardón (cactus wood), a mud-plaster coating, and a single narrow nave. Inside, visitors can admire 18th-century paintings from the Cusco School and artifacts of artistic significance.

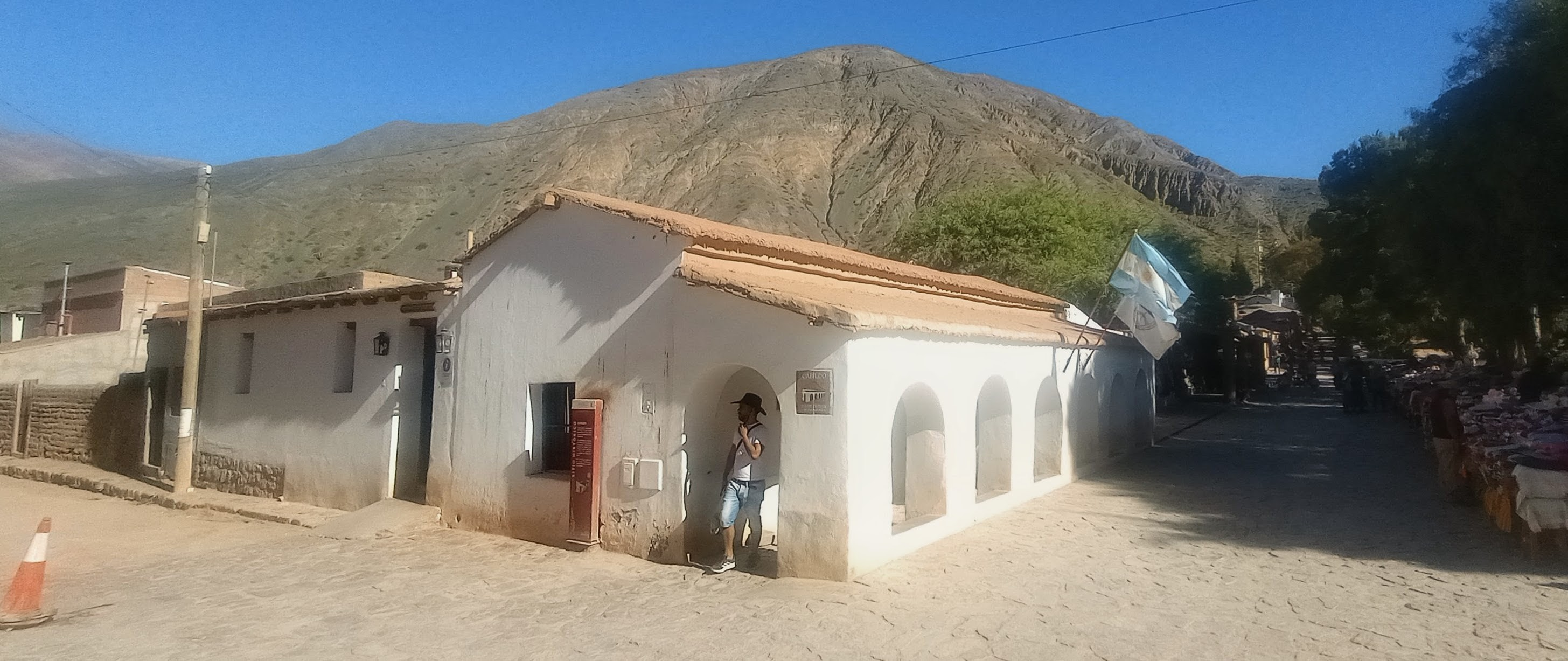
Cabildo de Purmamarca

Opening Hours

- Monday–Saturday: 8:00 AM – 12:30 PM and 4:00 PM – 8:00 PM
- Sunday: 9:00 AM – 12:00 PM and 6:00 PM – 9:00 PM

== Geography ==
The locality lies on Provincial Route 16, 4 km West of National Route 9, 65 km from Provincial capital San Salvador de Jujuy and 22 km from Tilcara.

It is located at the Quebrada de Purmamarca, sometimes considered part of the Quebrada de Humahuaca. The Cerro de los Siete Colores (Hill of the Seven Colours) shows its colourful face to the nearby town.

== Economy ==
Historically relegated from the commercial axis of the province, the area gained some economic thrust mainly due to two different yet related events:

On the one hand, the town's road connection has been greatly improved by the so-called Capricorn Axis asphalted commercial route via Cuesta del Lipán to Paso de Jama towards Atacama, and the Pacific Ocean. Even though this brought little direct benefit for the local industry, it did improve the influx of tourism.

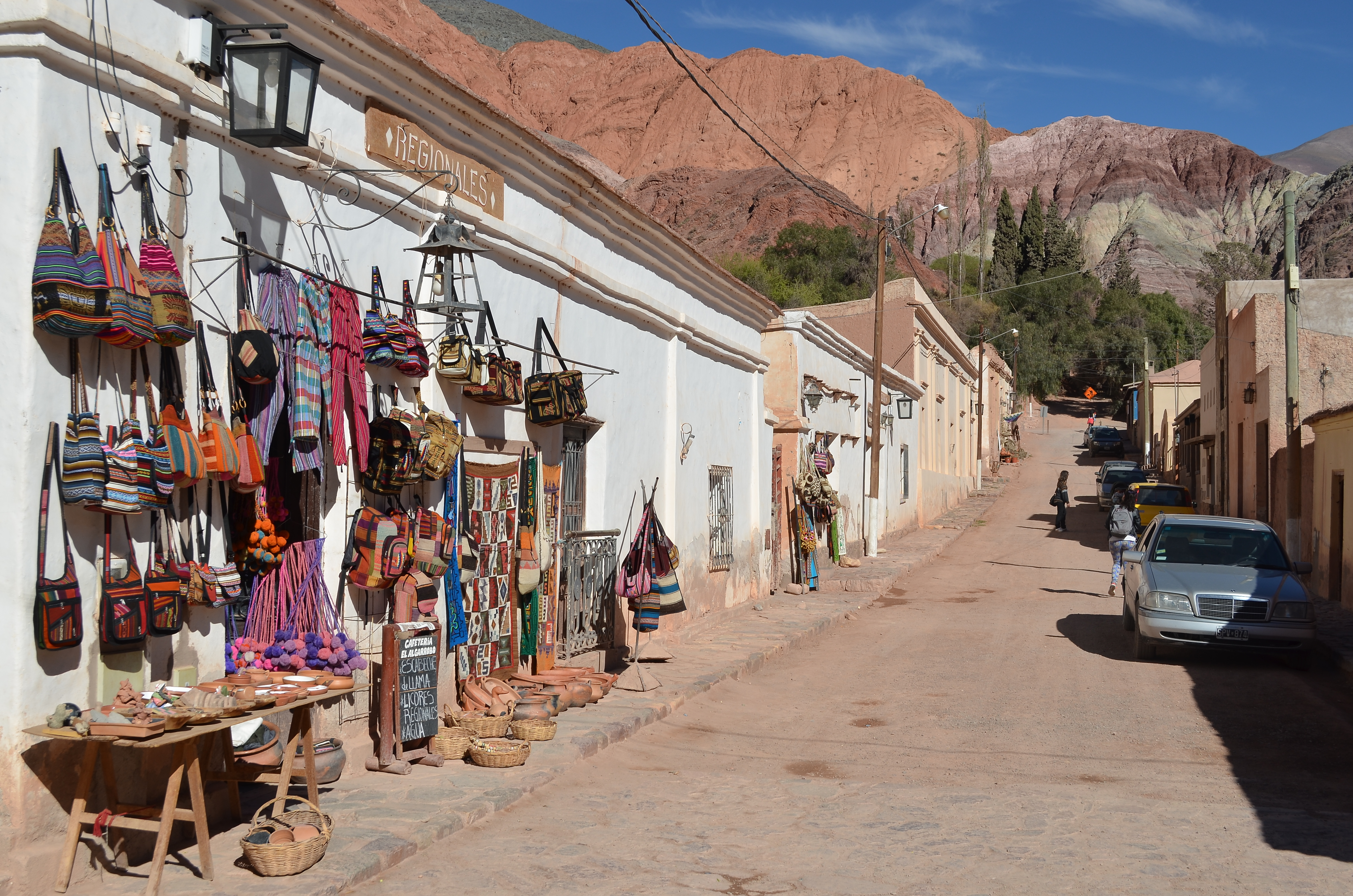
Street in Purmamarca looking towards the Cerro de los Siete Colores.

On the other hand, the Quebrada de Humahuaca was declared World Heritage Site by UNESCO in 2003, increasing the interest of both national and international tourism to the area. The colonial style and the Cerro de Siete Colores, as well as limited yet growing lodging options, make the town an interesting destination for tourists visiting the Argentine North.

Most other economic activities are linked to the tourism, including the manufacturing of handicrafts that are then sold at the local market in the main plaza, to lodging and tours.

== Tourism ==
The city's attraction include the aforementioned Cerro de los Siete Colores and the town handicraft market. It also serves as a starting point for treks such as the Paseo de los Colorados and Purmamarca River, and tours to Salinas Grandes, the Huachichocana archaeological site and the Laguna de Guayatayoc with its pink flamencos and wild geese.

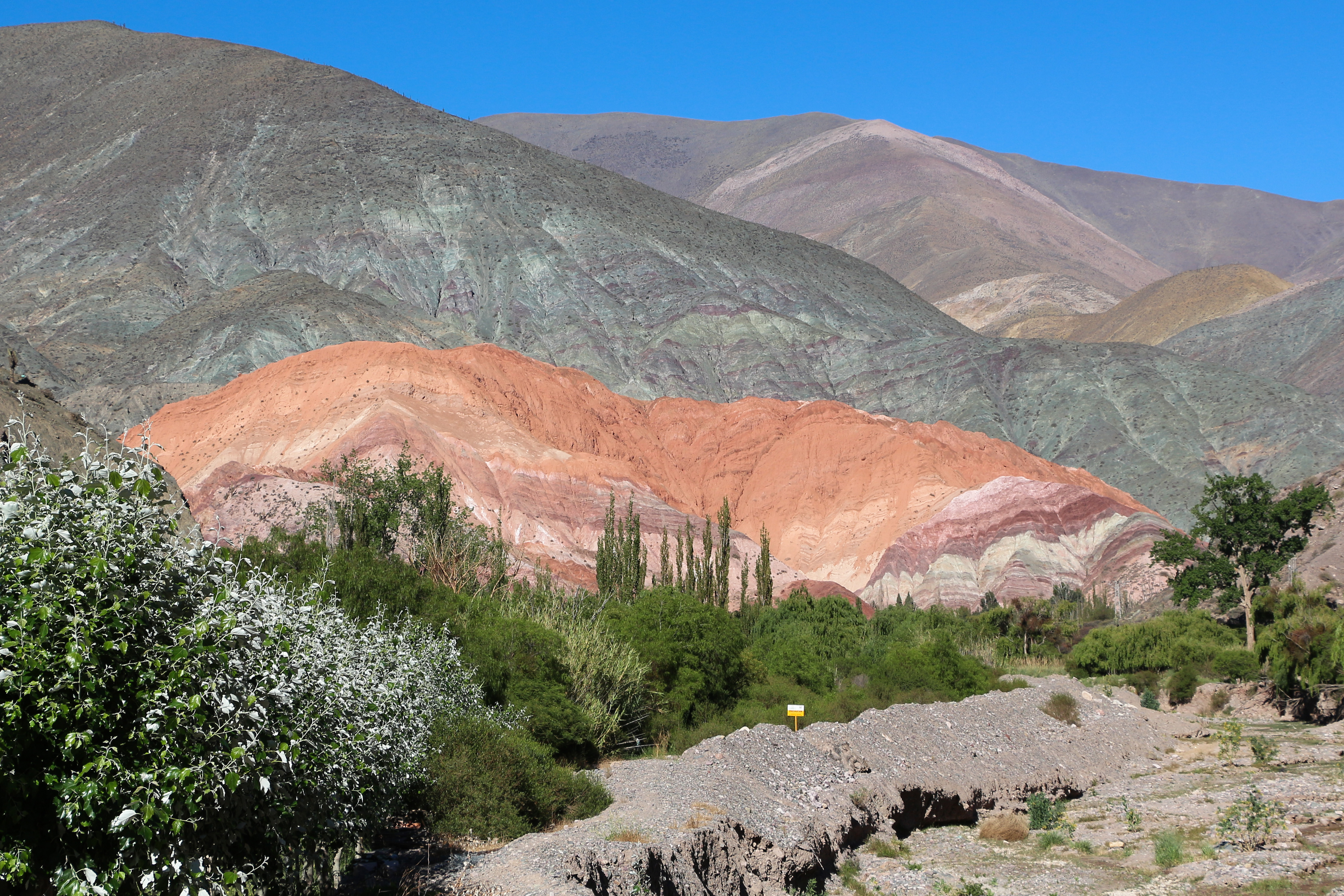
Cerro de los Siete Colores.

== See also ==
- Cerro de los Siete Colores
- Iruya
- Second Malón de la Paz
- Army of the North
- Purmamarca media at Commons
