= Humahuaca =

- City
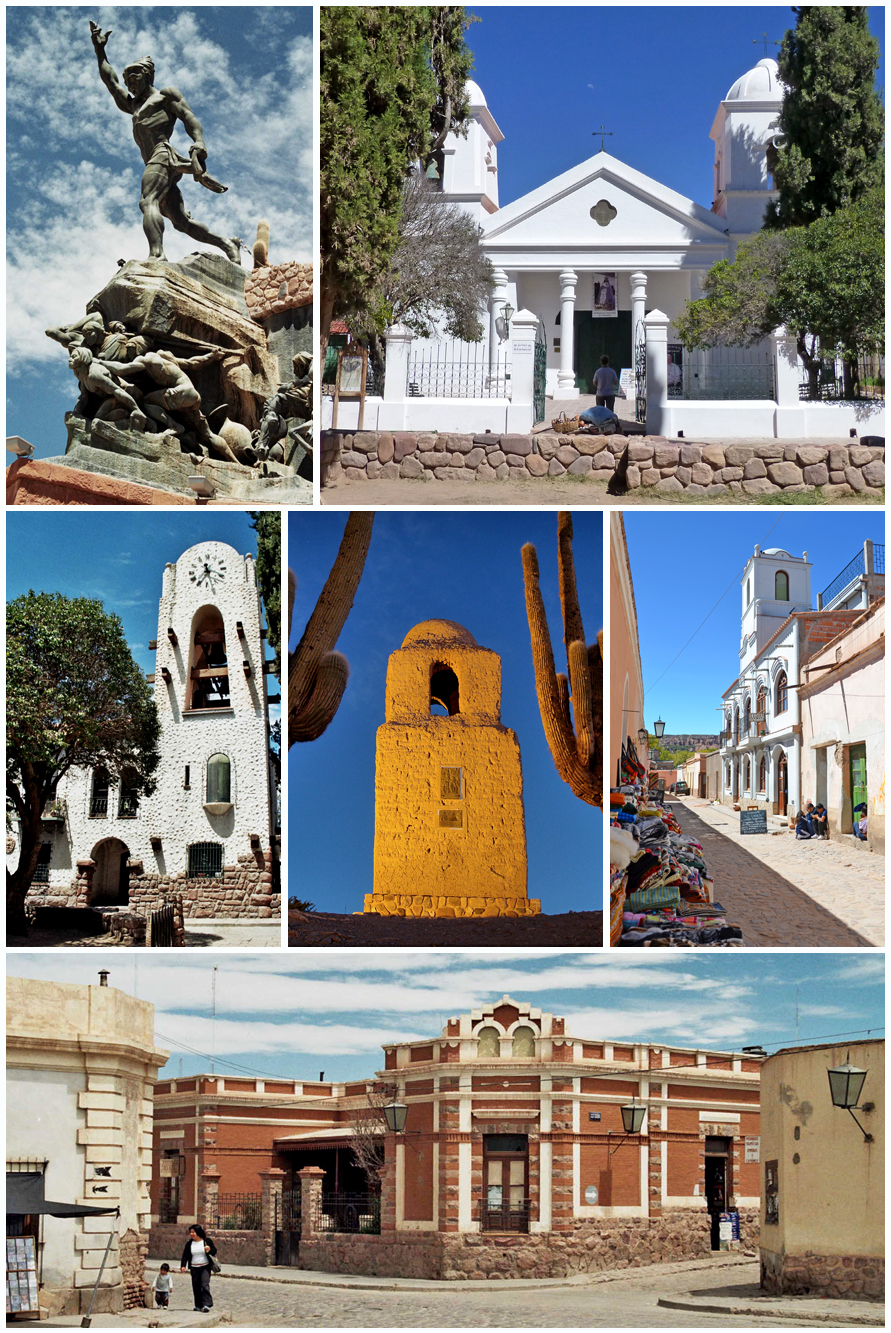

- Location of Humahuaca in Argentina
- Coordinates: 23°12′S 65°21′W
- Country: Argentina
- Province: Jujuy
- Department: Humahuaca
- Elevation: 3,012 m (9,882 ft)

Population (2001 census)
  - Total: 11,369
- Time zone: UTC−3 (ART)
- CPA base: Y4630
- Dialing code: +54 3887

Humahuaca (Spanish pronunciation: [umaˈwaka]) is a small city in the province of Jujuy, Argentina. Since 2003 declared World Heritage Site by UNESCO at the Paris conference. It has 11,369 inhabitants as per the 2001 census [INDEC], and is the principal town (seat) of the Department of Humahuaca. The city is widely known for its location at the Quebrada de Humahuaca, along the Eastern valley of the central Andean Altiplano.

Humahuaca is located north of Tilcara and Purmamarca, in the colourful valley of Quebrada de Humahuaca. The townhall is located in the center of the village and it possesses a tower which can be seen from the main square with a clock that chimes at 12 pm, after which a small door opens and a figure of Saint Francisco Solano comes out and makes the sign of the cross.

== Climate ==
Humahuaca has a cool arid climate (Köppen BWk), with two seasons: a mild summer with occasional thunderstorms from December to March, and a cool, extremely clear, rainless winter covering the rest of the year. Although afternoons are warm year-round, the extreme altitude means mornings are cool in summer and freezing in the rainless, cloudless winter.

Climate data for Humahuaca (1961-1970)
Month	Jan	Feb	Mar	Apr	May	Jun	Jul	Aug	Sep	Oct	Nov	Dec	Year
Record high °C (°F)	31.9 (89.4)	30.1 (86.2)	29.5 (85.1)	29.5 (85.1)	27.7 (81.9)	25.9 (78.6)	27.3 (81.1)	27.1 (80.8)	28.3 (82.9)	31.3 (88.3)	31.1 (88.0)	30.5 (86.9)	31.9 (89.4)
Mean daily maximum °C (°F)	23.6 (74.5)	23.4 (74.1)	22.7 (72.9)	23.2 (73.8)	21.5 (70.7)	20.2 (68.4)	19.5 (67.1)	20.8 (69.4)	22.6 (72.7)	24.0 (75.2)	23.9 (75.0)	23.8 (74.8)	22.5 (72.5)
Daily mean °C (°F)	15.1 (59.2)	14.7 (58.5)	14.1 (57.4)	12.1 (53.8)	10.2 (50.4)	8.4 (47.1)	7.5 (45.5)	9.4 (48.9)	11.7 (53.1)	13.0 (55.4)	13.7 (56.7)	14.6 (58.3)	12.0 (53.6)
Mean daily minimum °C (°F)	8.3 (46.9)	8.5 (47.3)	6.6 (43.9)	2.9 (37.2)	−0.8 (30.6)	−2.7 (27.1)	−3.4 (25.9)	−1.7 (28.9)	0.7 (33.3)	2.9 (37.2)	5.6 (42.1)	7.7 (45.9)	2.9 (37.2)
Record low °C (°F)	3.2 (37.8)	1.4 (34.5)	−1.6 (29.1)	−4.6 (23.7)	−9.2 (15.4)	−12.8 (9.0)	−13.9 (7.0)	−13.3 (8.1)	−9.8 (14.4)	−5.5 (22.1)	−4.3 (24.3)	1.0 (33.8)	−13.9 (7.0)
Average precipitation mm (inches)	40 (1.6)	48 (1.9)	26 (1.0)	4 (0.2)	0 (0)	0 (0)	0 (0)	1 (0.0)	1 (0.0)	1 (0.0)	18 (0.7)	34 (1.3)	173 (6.7)
Average precipitation days	6	6	4	0.9	0.1	0	0	0.2	0.1	0.3	3	5	25.6
Average relative humidity (%)	62	65	63	55	47	46	45	42	42	46	56	62	53
Source: Secretaria de Mineria

== Personalities ==
- Uña Ramos (1933-2014), composer and Quena (Kena) player, born in Humahuaca.

== Filmed in Humahuaca ==
- Verónico Cruz, (1988).
