= Quebrada de Humahuaca =

UNESCO World Heritage Site
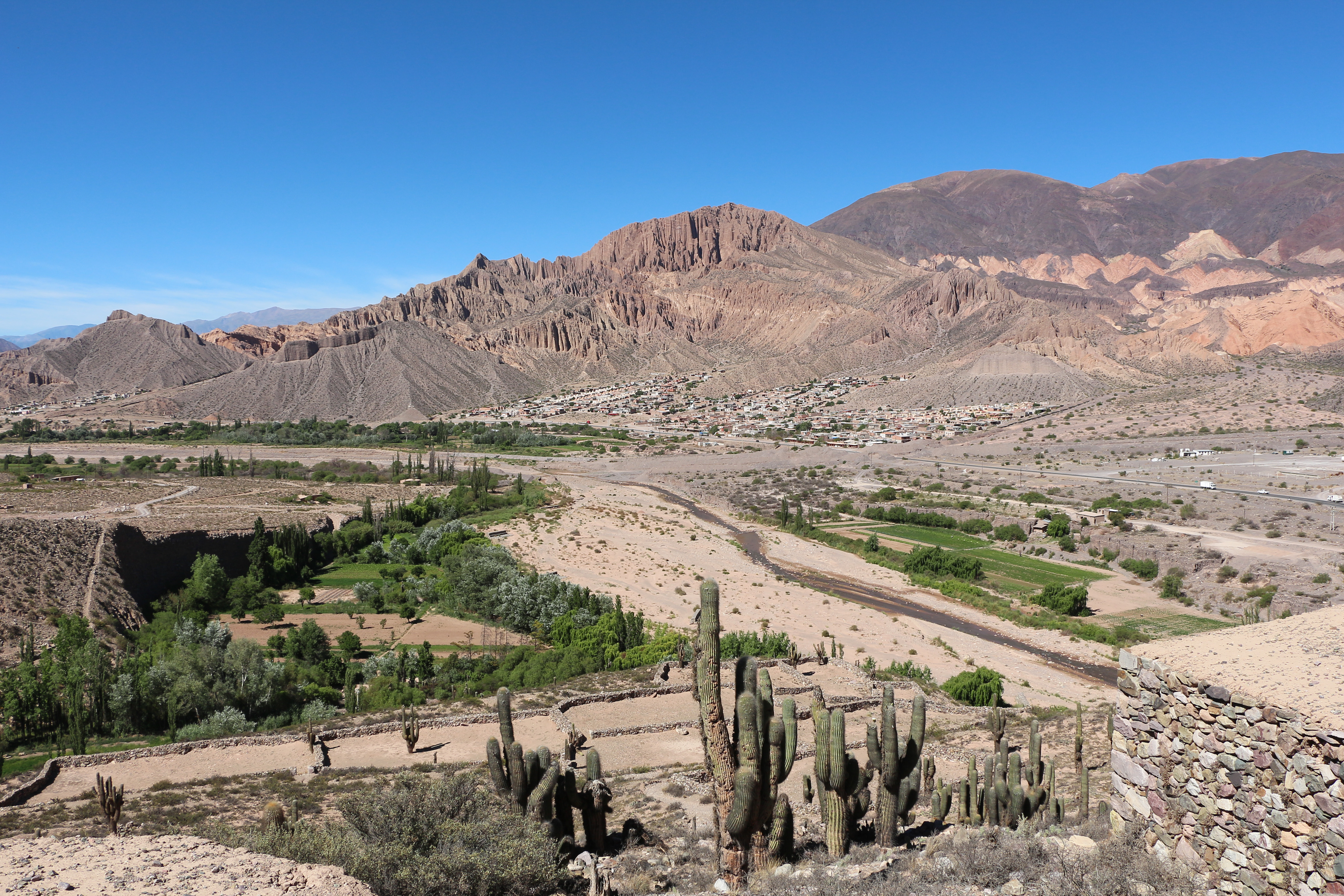
- View of the Quebrada de Humahuaca

- Location within Argentina
- Location: Jujuy Province, Argentina
- Criteria: Cultural: (ii), (iv), (v)
- Reference: 1116
- Inscription: 2003 (27th Session)
- Area: 172,116.4375 ha (425,308.979 acres)
- Buffer zone: 369,648.8125 ha (913,422.108 acres)
- Coordinates: 23°11′59″S 65°20′56″W

The Quebrada de Humahuaca is a narrow mountain valley located in the province of Jujuy in northwest Argentina, 1,649 km (1,025 mi) north of Buenos Aires (23°11′59″S 65°20′56″W). It is about 155 km (96 mi) long, oriented north–south, bordered by the Altiplano in the west and north, by the Sub-Andean hills in the east, and by the warm valleys (Valles Templados) in the south.

The name quebrada (literally "broken") translates as a deep valley or ravine. It receives its name from Humahuaca, a small city of 11,000 inhabitants. The Grande River (Río Grande), which is dry in winter, flows copiously through the Quebrada in the summer.

The region has always been a crossroads for economic, social and cultural communication. It has been populated for at least 10,000 years, since the settlement of the first hunter-gatherers, which is evidenced by substantial prehistoric remains. In particular, many stone-walled agricultural terraces, thought to originate more than 1500 years ago, are found throughout the region and are still in use today. The field system links a series of fortified towns called pucaras. The valley was later a caravan road for the Inca Empire in the 15th century, then an important link between the Viceroyalty of the Río de la Plata and the Viceroyalty of Peru, as well as a stage for many battles of the Spanish War of Independence.

The Quebrada de Humahuaca was designated a protected landscape in 2000. It was made a UNESCO World Heritage Site on 2 July 2003.

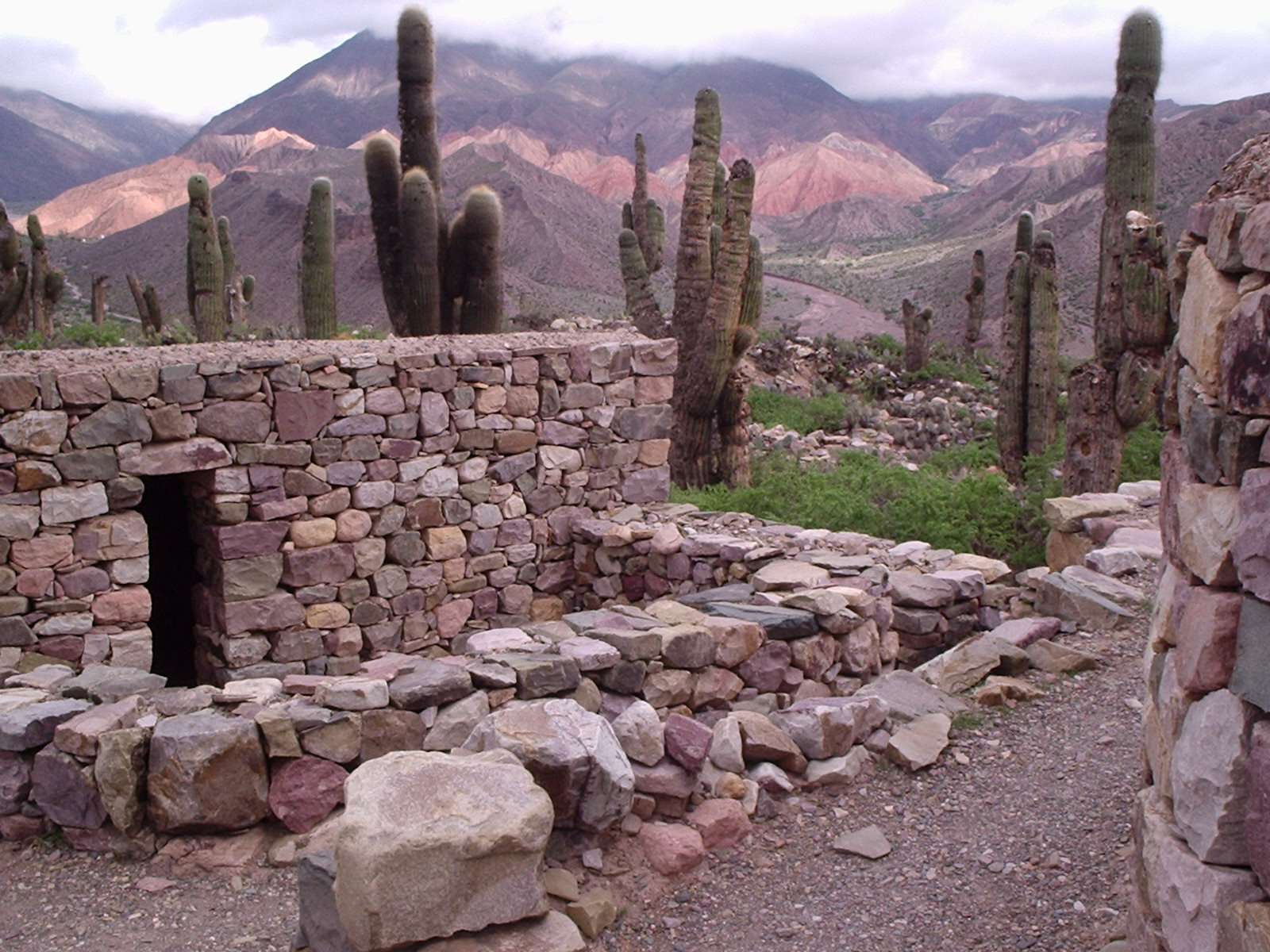
Pucará de Tilcara

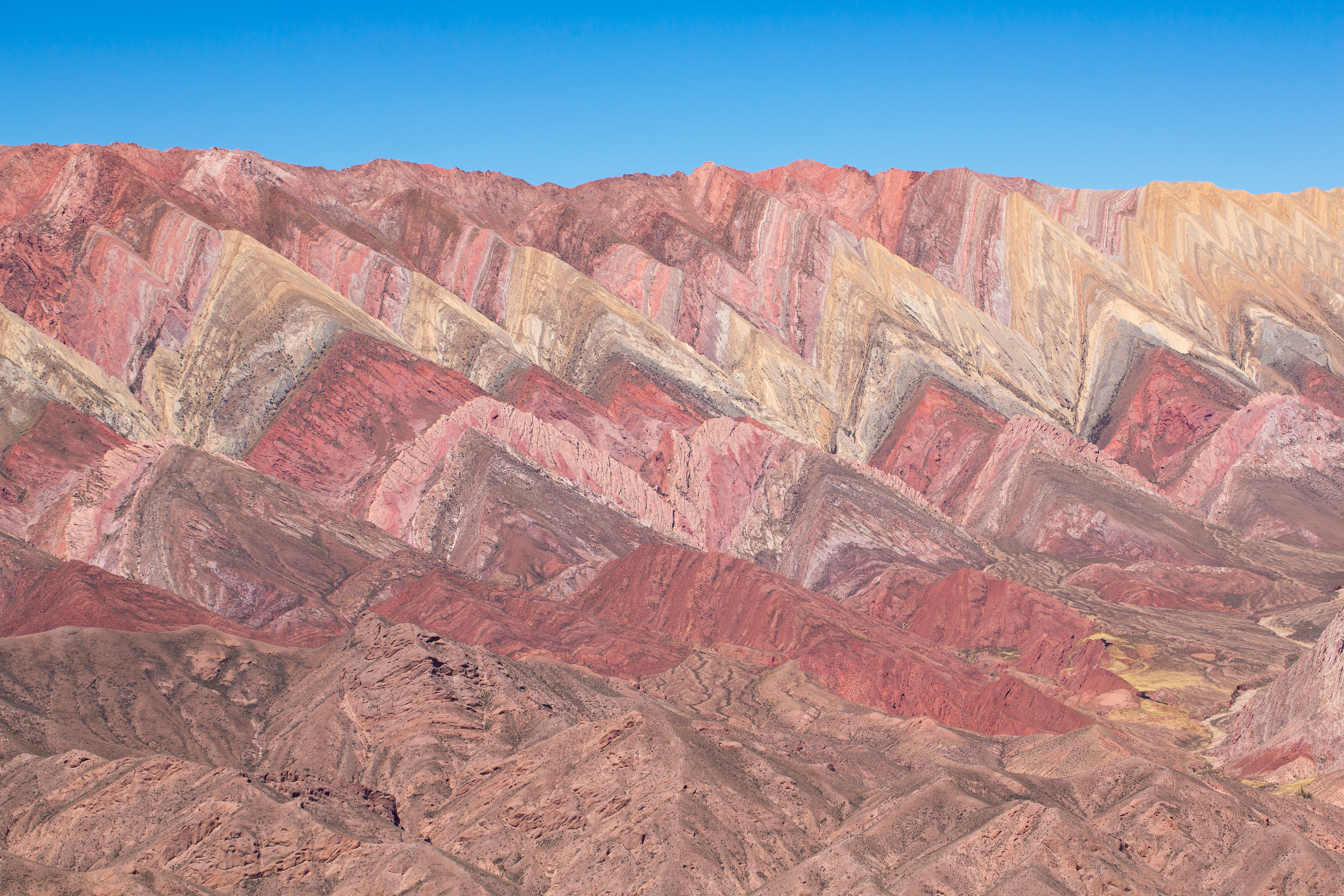
Hornocal

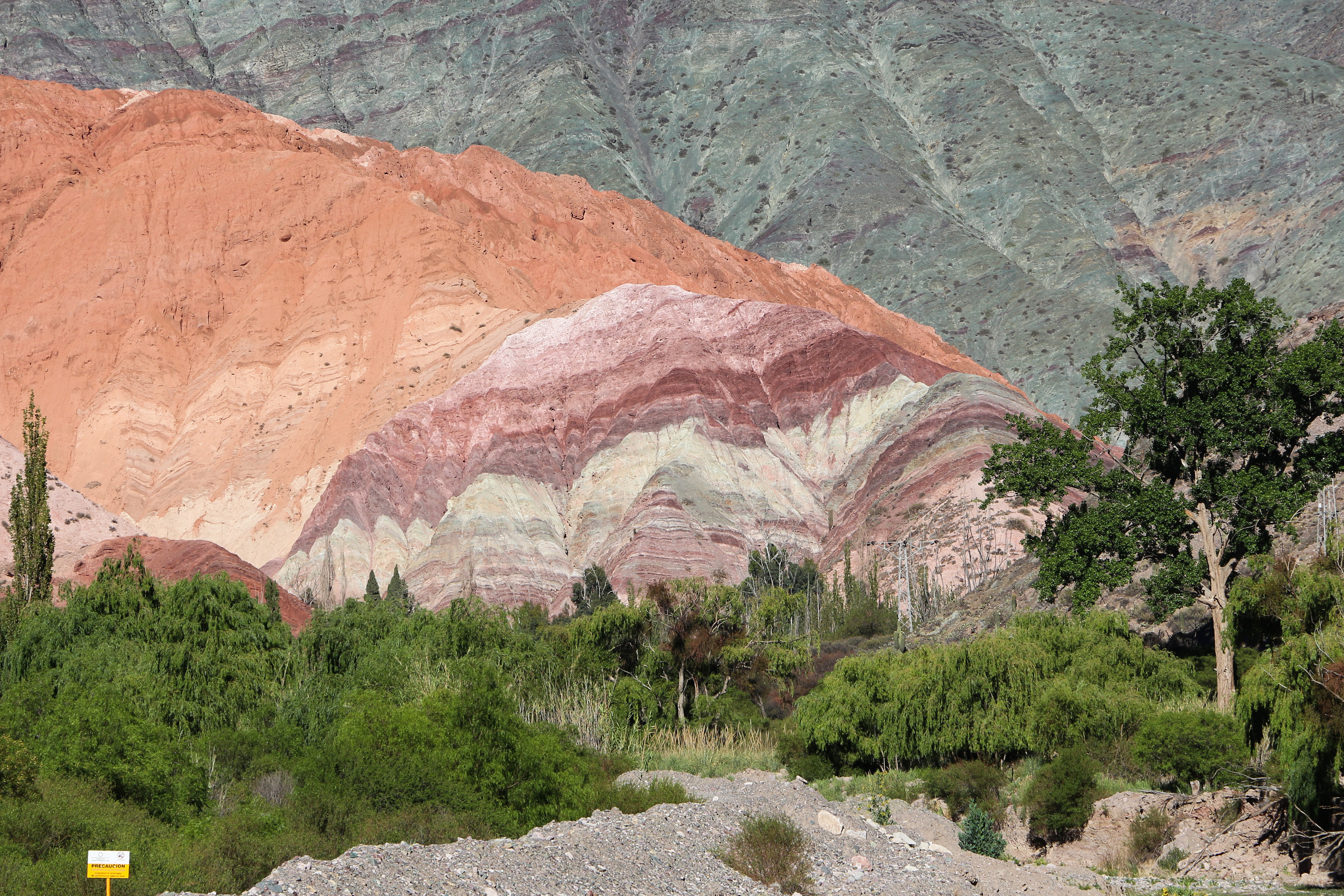
Cerro de los Siete Colores, Purmamarca

== See also ==
- Iruya
- Abra Pampa
- Hornillos de Eresma
- Huacalera
- Humahuaca
- La Quiaca
- Maimará
- Purmamarca
- Cerro de los Siete Colores
- Pucará de Tilcara
- Tilcara
- Volcán
- Serranía de Hornocal
