= Cuesta del Lipán =

- Municipality and town
- Interactive map of Cuesta del Lipán
- Country: Argentina
- Province: Jujuy Province
- Time zone: UTC−3 (ART)

Cuesta del Lipán is a town and municipality in Jujuy Province in Argentina.
