= Valle Grande =

Valle Grande ("Great Valley" in Spanish) or Vallegrande may refer to:

- Valle Grande Department, one of the Departments of Argentina in Jujuy Province
  - Valle Grande, Argentina, the capital city of Valle Grande Department
- Valle Grande, Lanzarote, in the Canary Islands
- Valle Grande, New Mexico, largest grass valley (valle) within the Valles Caldera of New Mexico, USA
- Vallegrande Province, Santa Cruz Department, Bolivia.
  - Vallegrande Municipality, a municipality in the namesake province
    - Vallegrande, the capital city of Vallegrande Province

== See also ==
- Valle Gran Rey, Spanish municipality
- Valle Grana, Italian valley
- Valley Grande, Alabama, American city
- Valle (disambiguation)
- Valgrind (disambiguation)
