= Talar (disambiguation) =

Talar is a Persian architectural term.

Talar may also refer to:

- Talar, East Azerbaijan
- Talar, Hormozgan
- Talár (newspaper), a daily Brahui-language newspaper
- Talar, German term for ceremonial robes, see academic dress

== See also ==
- El Talar (disambiguation)
