= La Higuera =

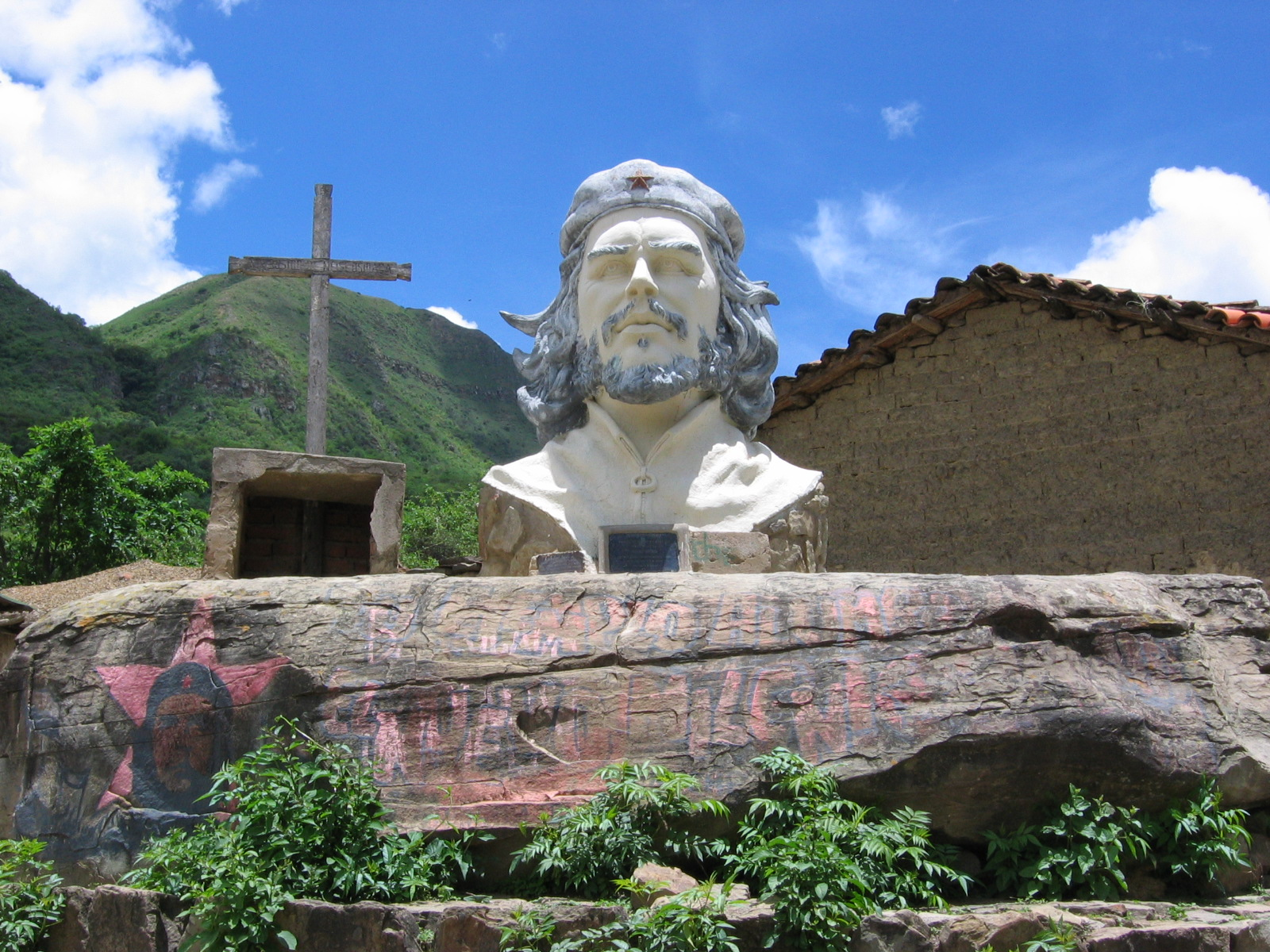
- The Che Guevara monument

- Location in Bolivia
- Coordinates: 18°47′41″S 64°12′04″W
- Country: Bolivia
- Department: Santa Cruz
- Province: Vallegrande
- Municipality: Pucará
- Canton: La Higuera

Population (2001)
  - Total: 119
- Time zone: UTC-4 (BOT)

La Higuera (Spanish for 'The Fig Tree'; pronounced [lajˈɣeɾa]) is a small village in Bolivia located in the Province of Vallegrande, in the Department of Santa Cruz. It is situated in the La Higuera Canton (civil parish) belonging to the Pucará Municipality.

== Geography ==
The village is situated some 150 km (bee-line) southwest of Santa Cruz de la Sierra and 15 southwest of Pucará. La Higuera lies at an elevation of 1950 m. Its population (according to the 2001 census) is 119, mainly indigenous Guaraní people.

== History ==
On October 8, 1967, the Argentine Marxist revolutionary Che Guevara was captured by the CIA-assisted Bolivian Army in the nearby ravine Quebrada del Churo, ending his campaign to create a continental revolution in South America. Che Guevara was held in the schoolhouse, where he was killed the next day. The body was then brought to Vallegrande, where it was placed on display and afterwards secretly buried under an airstrip.

=== Che tourism ===
"Tourists from all over the world visit La Higuera on pilgrimage. A Frenchman has opened a hostel at the telegraph office where the guerrilla fighters made their last attempt to establish contact with the outside world. Next door, Cuban doctors provide treatment to the destitute farm workers free of charge. Images of the revolutionary hang in the villagers' huts, and many people pray to "Santo Ernesto" (Saint Ernesto) who is said to bring about miracles."

— Der Spiegel, October 2007

A monument to "El Che" and a memorial in the former schoolhouse are the major tourist attractions for this area. La Higuera is a stop on the "Ruta del Che" (Che Guevara Trail) which was inaugurated in 2004.
