= Football League Jujeña =

Football league in Argentina

- Most recent season or competition: Jujeña Football League 2014
- Sport: Association football
- Founded: 1928
- Motto: Life is among all
- No. of teams: 15
- Country: Argentina
- Continent: Conmebol
- Most recent champion: Luján Athletic Club
- Most titles: Gimnasia Jujuy (23)
- Broadcaster: Gamal 7 (Jujuy)
- Promotion to: Match of the Interior
- Relegation to: First B (Jujuy); Jujeño Tournament A
- Domestic cup: Jujuy Cup

The Jujeña Football League is one of the Soccer Regional Leagues in Argentina and is the entity that brings together football teams Province Jujuy. It was founded on December 15, 1922 and is based in the city of San Salvador de Jujuy.

Jujuy League currently has representation at the national level with clubs Gimnasia Jujuy in the First National B Argentine football, and clubs Altos Hornos Zapla and Talleres de Perico both in the Argentine Match B.

The main purpose of the clubs is to qualify for the Match of the Interior Argentine fifth level tournaments organized by the Argentine Football Association.

== Champions League ==
=== Jujuy amateur Football League ===
TOP 10 Clubs (1929-1933)

- 1928: General Belgrano
- 1929: United Youth
- 1930: Regiment 20
- 1931 : General Belgrano
- 1932 : General Belgrano
- 1933 : No Competition problems due to casual quake

=== Jujuy Football League ===
TOP 15 Club (1933–1949)

- 1934 : Regiment 20
- 1935 : General Belgrano
- 1936 : Engineer Arrieta
- 1937 : Not deputed
- 1938 : C. R. Y. S.
- 1939 : Independent
- 1940 : Independent

=== Jujuy Football League ===
- 1941 : Cazadores de Los Andes
- 1942 : General Belgrano
- 1943: Independent
- 1944 : Cazadores de Los Andes
- 1945 : Gymnastics and Fencing
- 1946 : Gymnastics and Fencing
- 1947: Gymnastics and Fencing
- 1948 : Gymnastics and Fencing
- 1949 : Do not deputed by the quake
- 1950: Do not deputed by the quake
- 1951 : Do not deputed by the quake
- 1952 : Gymnastics and Fencing

=== Jujeña Football League ===
TOP 20 Clubs (1953–1970)

- 1953 : No , the deputed
- 1954: General Belgrano
- 1955 : No , the deputed
- 1956 : No , the deputed
- 1957 : No , the deputed
- 1958 : No , the deputed
- 1959 : Discontinued
- 1960 : Athletic Gorriti
- 1961 : Altos Hornos Zapla
- 1962 : Gymnastics and Fencing
- 1963: Gymnastics and Fencing
- 1964 : Talleres de Perico
- 1965 : Gymnastics and Fencing
- 1966 : Talleres de Perico
- 1967: Gymnastics and Fencing
- 1968: Independent
- 1969: Gymnastics and Fencing
- 1970: No , the deputed

TOP 15 Clubs (1970–present)

- 1971: No competition
- 1972: Altos Hornos Zapla
- 1973: Altos Hornos Zapla
- 1974: Altos Hornos Zapla
- 1975: Gymnastics and Fencing
- 1976: Gymnastics and Fencing
- 1977: Gymnastics and Fencing
- 1978: Altos Hornos Zapla
- 1979 : Gymnastics and Fencing
- 1980: Gymnastics and Fencing
- 1981: Gymnastics and Fencing
- 1982 : Athletic Cuyaya
- 1983: Altos Hornos Zapla
- 1984: Altos Hornos Zapla
- 1985 : Youth Cellulose
- 1986: Gymnastics and Fencing
- 1987: Altos Hornos Zapla
- 1988 : Youth Cellulose
- 1989 : Altos Hornos Zapla
- 1990 : Talleres de Perico
- 1991 : Talleres de Perico
- 1992 : Athletic Gorriti
- 1993 : Talleres de Perico
- 1994 : Altos Hornos Zapla
- 1995 : Ciudad de Nieva
- 1996 : Ciudad de Nieva (A)
- 1996-1997 Altos Hornos Zapla (C)
- 1997 : Gimnasia (A)
- 1997-1998 Altos Hornos Zapla (C)
- 1998 : Talleres de Perico
- 1999 : Athletic Gorriti
- 2000 : Talleres de Perico
- 2001 : Talleres de Perico
- 2002 : Altos Hornos Zapla
- 2003 : General Lavalle
- 2004 : Gymnastics and Fencing
- 2005 : Deportivo Los Perales
- 2006 : Athletic Cuyaya
- 2007 : Altos Hornos Zapla
- 2008 : Gymnastics and Fencing
- 2009 : Gymnastics and Fencing
- 2010 : Gymnastics and Fencing
- 2011 Athletic Cuyaya
- 2012: Gymnastics and Fencing
- 2013 Athletic Luján
- 2014 : For depute

== History Jujeña Football League ==
Club	Title	Season Champion
Gimnasia Jujuy	'23	1945, 1946, 1947, 1948, 1952, 1962, 1963, 1965, 1967, 1969, 1975, 1976, 1977, 1979, 1980, 1981, 1986, 1997 -A, 2004, 2008, 2009, 2010, 2012.
Altos Hornos Zapla	'14	1961, 1972, 1973, 1974, 1978, 1983, 1984, 1987, 1989, 1994, 1996 - C, 1997 - C, 2002, 2007 .
Talleres de Perico	'8	1964, 1966, 1990, 1991, 1993, 1998, 2000, 2001 .
General Belgrano	'6	1928, 1931, 1932, 1935, 1942, 1954 .
Independent (Jujuy)	'4	1939, 1940, 1943, 1968.
Athletic Gorriti	'3	1960, 1992, 1999 .
Athletic Cuyaya	'3	1982, 2006, 2011 .
20 Regiment	'2	1930, 1934 .
Hunters Los Andes	'2	1941, 1944.
Youth Pulp	'2	1985, 1988 .
Ciudad de Nieva	'2	1995, 1996 -A.
Club Atlético Luján	'1	2013
United Youth	'1	1929.
Engineer Arrieta	'1	1936.
C. R. Y. S.	'1	1938.
General Lavalle	'1	2003.
Deportivo Los Perales	'1	2005.

== Participating Clubs ==
These are the teams that make the Jujeña Football League .

== San Salvador de Jujuy ==
- Club Ciudad de Nieva
- Club Atlético Cuyaya
- General Lavalle Athletic Club
- Athletic Club Gimnasia Jujuy
- Club Atlético Gorriti
- Sports Club Luján
- Club Sportivo Palermo
- The Vineyard Athletic Association
- Club Deportivo El Cruce
- General Belgrano Athletic Club
- Athletic Club Los Perales Trade

== Palpalá ==
- Cultural and Sports Association Altos Hornos Zapla
- Club Atlético Palpalá

== Perico City ==
- Club Atlético Talleres

== Tilcara ==
- Terry Athletic Club

== See also ==
- First B (Jujuy)
- Cup Jujuy
