= San Antonio, Jujuy =

Coordinates: 24°22′03″S 65°20′07″W

San Antonio
- Municipality and town
- Interactive map of San Antonio
- Country: Argentina
- Province: Jujuy Province
- Time zone: UTC−3 (ART)

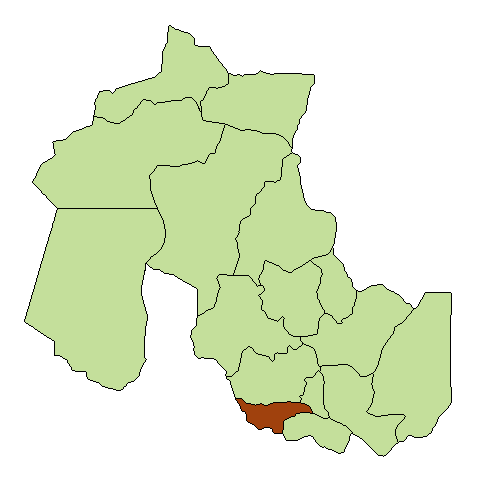
San Antonio within Jujuy, Argentina

San Antonio is a town and municipality in Jujuy Province in Argentina.
