= La Almona =

Coordinates: 24°15′29″S 65°23′31″W

- Rural municipality and village
- Interactive map of La Almona
- Country: Argentina
- Province: Jujuy Province
- Time zone: UTC−3 (ART)

La Almona is a rural municipality and village in Jujuy Province in Argentina.
