= Tilcara Department =

Tilcara Departamento Tilcara
- Department
- Interactive map of Tilcara
- Country: Argentina
- Seat: Tilcara

Area
  - Total: 1,845 km^{2} (712 sq mi)

Population (2022)
  - Total: 14,721
  - Density: 7.979/km^{2} (20.67/sq mi)

Tilcara is a department of the province of Jujuy (Argentina).
