= Capitán Av. Vidal Villagomez Toledo Airport =

- IATA: VAH; ICAO: SLVG

Summary
- Airport type: Public
- Serves: Valle Grande, Bolivia
- Elevation AMSL: 6,551 ft / 1,997 m
- Coordinates: 18°28′45″S 64°5′58″W

Map
- Location of airport in Bolivia

Runways
Direction	Length		Surface
Direction	m	ft	Surface
01/19	1,220	4,003	Grass
- Sources: Landings.com Google Maps GCM

Capitán Av. Vidal Villagomez Toledo Airport (Spanish: Aeropuerto Capitán Av. Vidal Villagomez Toledo) (IATA: VAH, ICAO: SLVG) is an airport serving Vallegrande, a town in the Santa Cruz Department of Bolivia.

Vallegrande is within a shallow basin of the Cordillera Central mountain range. The airport is just northeast of the town, with low hills nearby to the west, and more distant in all quadrants.

== See also ==
- Transport in Bolivia
- List of airports in Bolivia
