= Valgrind (disambiguation) =

Valgrind may refer to:

- Valgrind, the main entrance to Valhalla in Norse mythology
- Valgrind, a programming tool named after this mythical gate

== See also ==
- Valle Grande (disambiguation)
