= El Talar =

El Talar may refer to:

- El Talar, Buenos Aires, a town in Tigre Partido, Buenos Aires Province, Argentina
- El Talar, Jujuy, a town in Argentina
