= Guerrero, Jujuy =

Coordinates: 24°13′S 65°24′W

Guerrero (Jujuy)
- Rural municipality and village
- Interactive map of Guerrero (Jujuy)
- Country: Argentina
- Province: Jujuy Province
- Time zone: UTC−3 (ART)

Guerrero (Jujuy) is a rural municipality and village in Jujuy Province in Argentina.
