= Pampa Blanca, Jujuy =

Coordinates: 24°31′59″S 65°04′37″W

Pampa Blanca
- Municipality and town
- Interactive map of Pampa Blanca
- Country: Argentina
- Province: Jujuy Province
- Time zone: UTC−3 (ART)

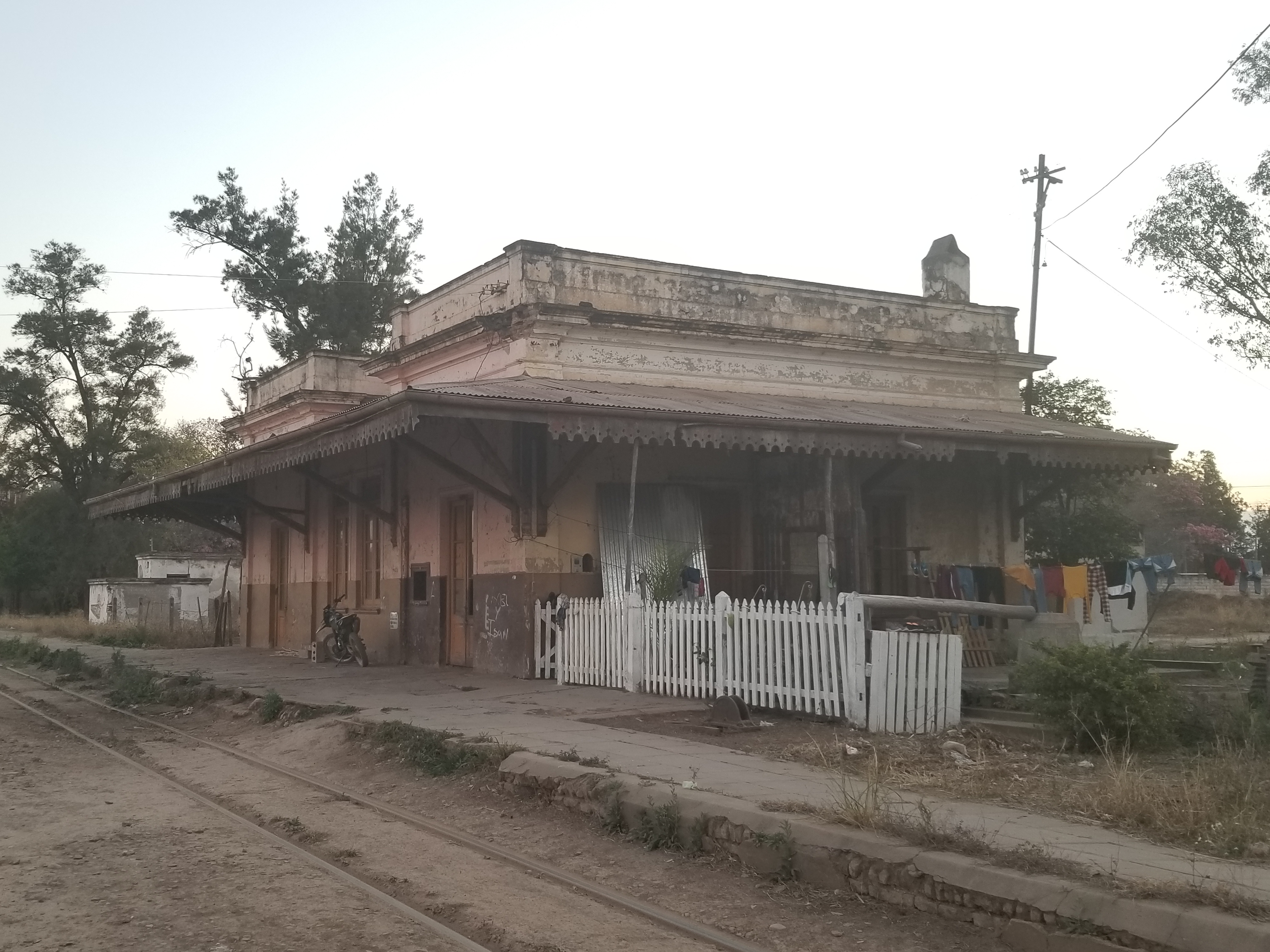
Estación Pampa Blanca

Pampa Blanca is a town and municipality in Jujuy Province in Argentina.
