= Llulluchayoc =

Coordinates: 22°33′00″S 65°23′13″W

Llulluchayoc Llulluch'ayuq
- Rural municipality and village
- Interactive map of Llulluchayoc
- Country: Argentina
- Province: Jujuy Province
- Time zone: UTC−3 (ART)

Llulluchayoc (hispanicized spelling from Quechua Llulluch'ayuq, llulluch'a an edible gelatinous, dark green bacteria (nostocales), -yuq a suffix to indicate ownership, "the one with the llulluch'a") is a rural municipality and village in Jujuy Province in Argentina.
