= Tumbaya =

Coordinates: 23°51′S 65°28′W

- Municipality and town
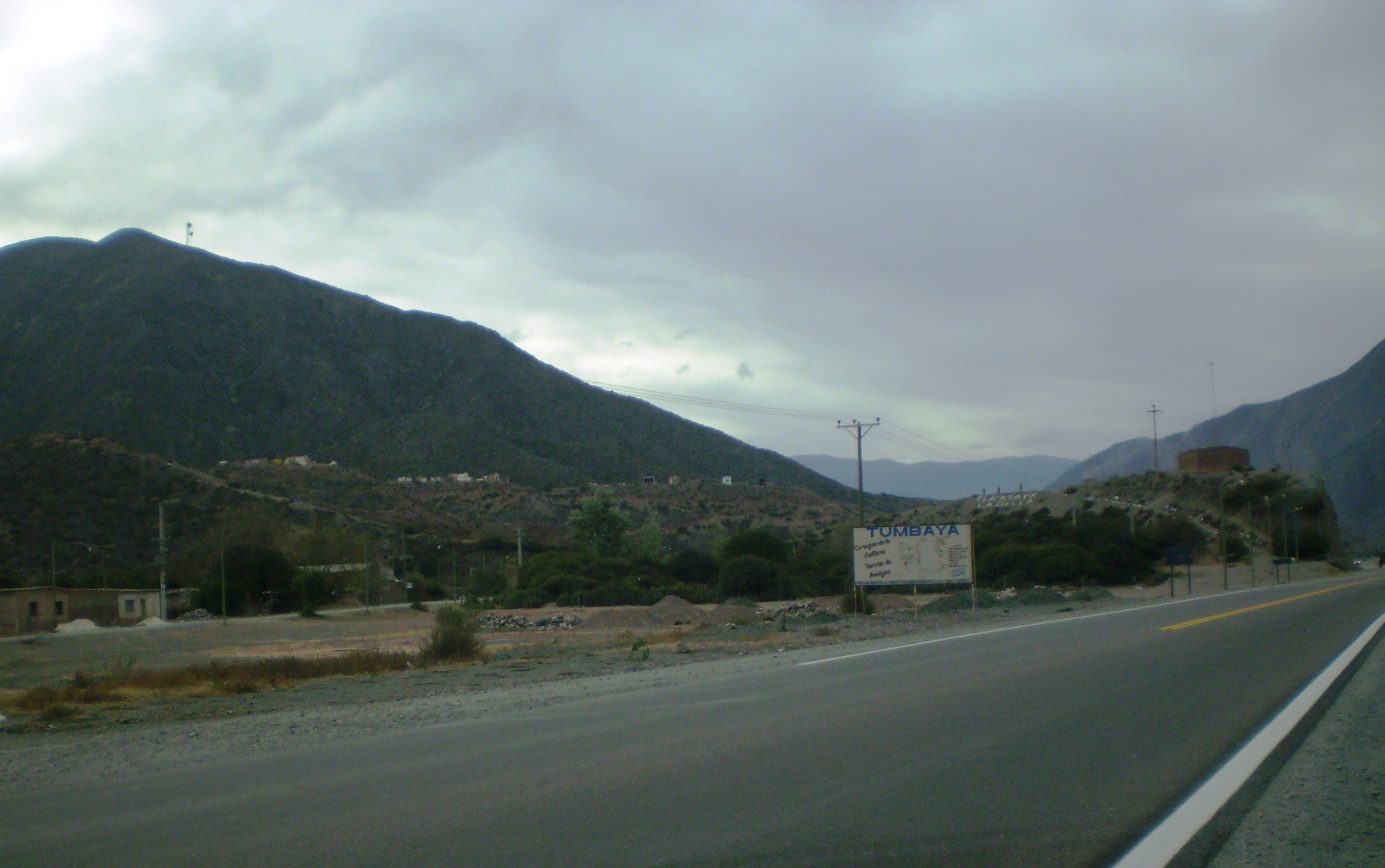

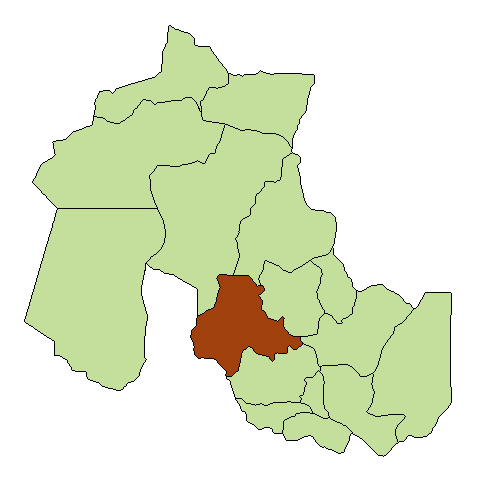
- Country: Argentina
- Province: Jujuy Province
- Department: Tumbaya

Government
  - Presidente comunal: Liliana Carmen Valderrama, PJ
- Elevation: 6,886 ft (2,099 m)

Population (2001)
  - Total: 321
- Time zone: UTC−3 (ART)
- Postal code: Y4618
- Area code: 0388

Tumbaya is a town and municipality in Tumbaya Department, Jujuy Province, Argentina.
