= San José, Jujuy =

San José
- Rural municipality and village
- Location within Argentina
- Coordinates: 22°08′S 65°28′W
- Country: Argentina
- Province: Jujuy Province
- Elevation: 11,535 ft (3,516 m)

Population (2001)
  - Total: 43
- Time zone: UTC−3 (ART)

San José is a rural municipality and village in Jujuy Province in Argentina.
