= San Francisco de la Nueva Provincia de Álava =

- Municipality and town
- Interactive map of San Francisco de la Nueva Provincia de Álava
- Country: Argentina
- Province: Jujuy Province
- Time zone: UTC−3 (ART)

San Francisco de la Nueva Provincia de Álava is a town and municipality in Jujuy Province in Argentina.
