= Tumbaya Department =

Tumbaya Departamento Tumbaya
- Department
- Interactive map of Tumbaya
- Country: Argentina
- Seat: Tumbaya

Area
  - Total: 3,442 km^{2} (1,329 sq mi)

Population (2022)
  - Total: 5,381
  - Density: 1.563/km^{2} (4.049/sq mi)

Tumbaya is a department of the province of Jujuy (Argentina).
