= Vallegrande Municipality =

- Municipality
- Location of Vallegrande within Bolivia
- Coordinates: 18°45′S 63°55′W
- Country: Bolivia
- Department: Santa Cruz Department
- Province: Vallegrande Province
- Capital: Vallegrande

Area
  - Total: 3,191 km^{2} (1,232 sq mi)
- Elevation: 2,030 m (6,660 ft)

Population (2012)
  - Total: 17,208
  - Density: 5.393/km^{2} (13.97/sq mi)

Vallegrande Municipality is the first municipal section of the Vallegrande Province in the Santa Cruz Department, Bolivia. Its capital is Vallegrande.

== Administrative divisions ==
The municipality of Vallegrande is divided into sixteen cantons.

- Alto Seco (cantón)
- Chaco (cantón)
- El Bello (cantón)
- Guadalupe (cantón)
- Khasa Monte (cantón)
- Loma Larga (cantón)
- Mankaillpa (cantón)
- Masicurí (cantón)
- Naranjos (cantón)
- Piraymiri (cantón)
- San Juan del Tucumansillo (cantón)
- Santa Ana (cantón)
- Santa Rosita (cantón)
- Sitanos (cantón)
- Temporal (cantón)
- Vallegrande (cantón)

== Languages ==
The predominant language in the Vallegrande Municipality is Spanish.

Language	Inhabitants
Quechua	405
Aymara	103
Guaraní	12
Another native	21
Spanish	16,129
Foreign	80
Only native	61
Native and Spanish	446
Only Spanish	15,688
