= Jujuy Province =

Province of Argentina

Coordinates: 23°45′S 65°30′W

Jujuy
- Province
- Province of Jujuy; Provincia de Jujuy (Spanish); Jujuy Wamani (Quechua)
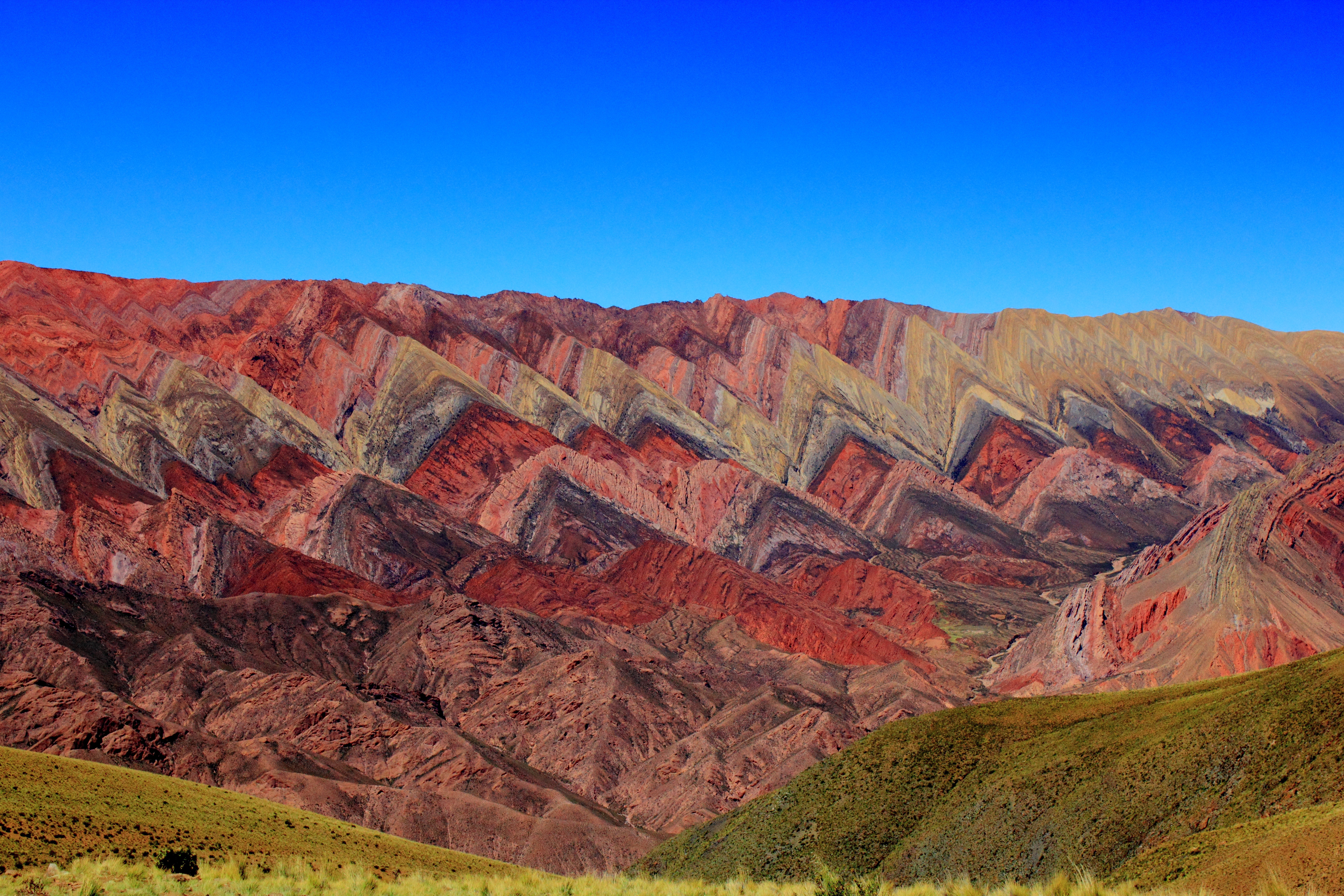
- The Serranía de Hornocal

- Flag Coat of arms

- Location of Jujuy within Argentina
- Country: Argentina
- Capital: San Salvador de Jujuy
- Departments: 16
- Municipalities and municipal commissions: 61

Government
  - Governor: Carlos Sadir (UCR)
  - Vice Governor: Alberto Bernis (UCR)
  - Legislature: 48
  - National Deputies: 6
  - National Senators: Ezequiel Atauche (LLA); Vilma Bedia (LLA); Carolina Moisés (PJ)

Area Ranked 20th
  - Total: 53,219 km^{2} (20,548 sq mi)

Population (2022 census)
  - Total: 797,955
  - Rank: 14th
  - Density: 14.994/km^{2} (38.834/sq mi)
- Demonym: jujeño

GDP
  - Total: peso 51 billion (US$3.5 billion) (2016)
- Time zone: UTC−3 (ART)
- ISO 3166 code: AR-Y
- HDI (2021): 0.840 very high (16th)
- Website: www.jujuy.gov.ar

Jujuy [xuˈxuj] is a province of Argentina, located in the extreme northwest of the country, at the borders with Chile and Bolivia. The only neighboring Argentine province is Salta to the east and south.

== Geography ==
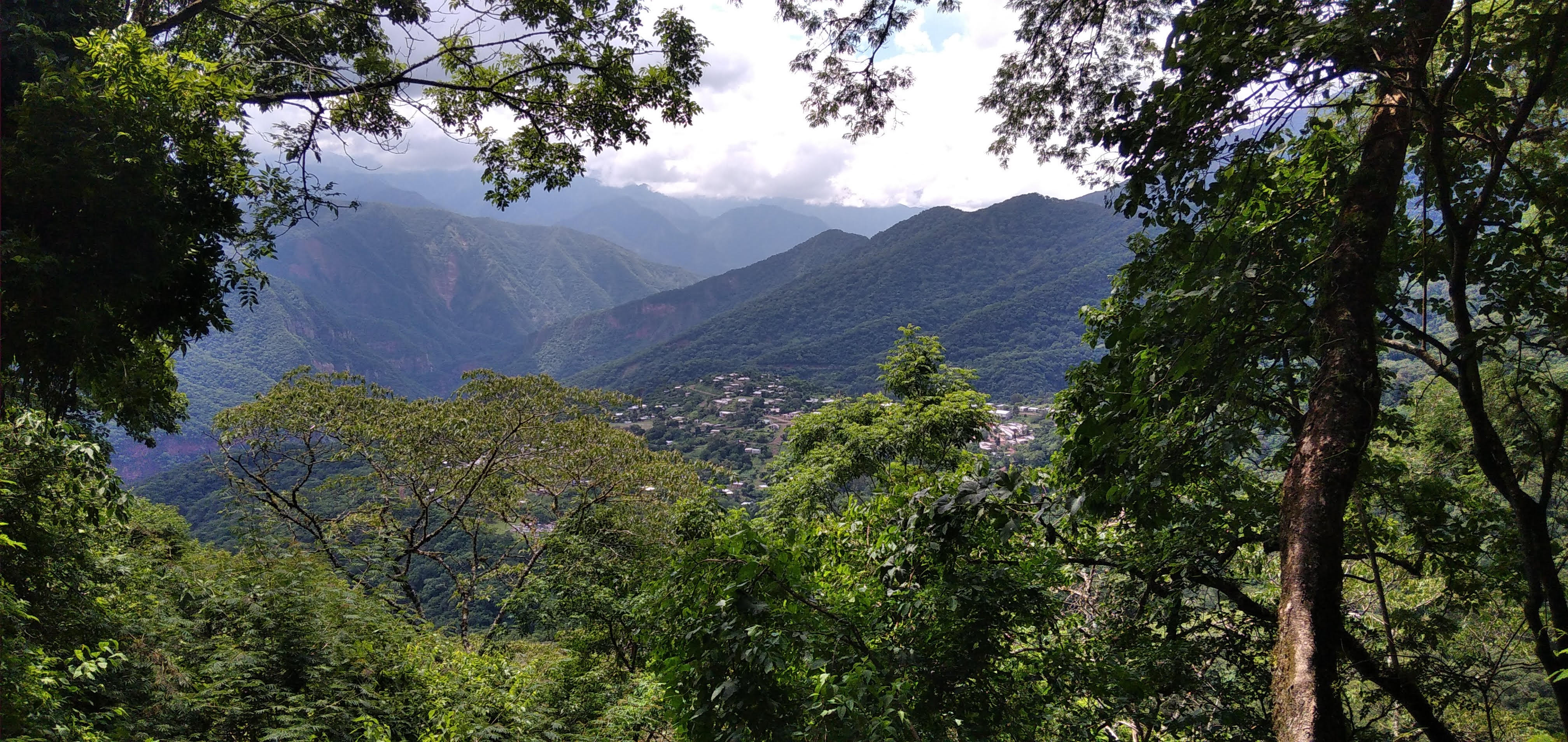
View of San Francisco in las Southern Andean Yungas.

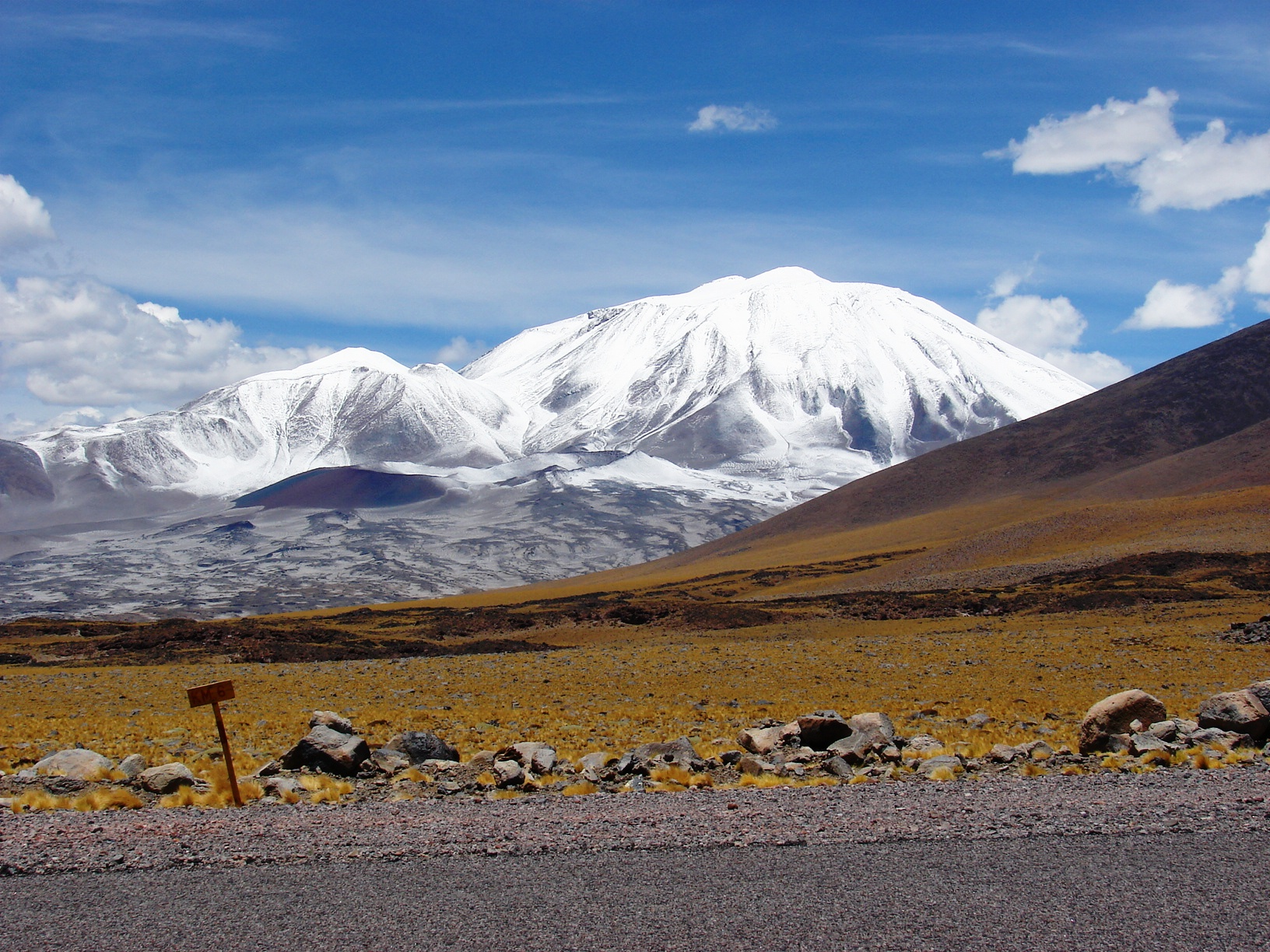
The Andes near the Paso de Jama.

There are three main areas in Jujuy:

- The Altiplano, a plateau 3,500 meters (11,500 ft) high with peaks of 5,000 meters (16,000 ft), covers most of the province.
- The Río Grande of Jujuy cuts through the Quebrada de Humahuaca canyon, of heights between 1,000 and 3,500 meters (3,300 and 11,500 ft).
- To the southeast, the sierras descends to the Gran Chaco region.

The vast difference in height and climate produces desert areas such as the Salinas Grandes salt mines and subtropical Yungas jungle.

The terrain of the province is mainly arid and semi-desertic across the different areas, except for the El Ramal valley of the San Francisco River. Temperature difference between day and night is wider in higher lands, and precipitation is scarce outside the temperate area of the San Francisco River.

The Grande River and the San Francisco River flow to the Bermejo River. The San Juan, La Quiaca, Yavi and Sansana Rivers flow to the Pilcomayo River.

== History ==
Pre-Columbian inhabitants known as the Omaguacas and Ocloyas practiced agriculture and domesticated the guanaco. They had huts made of mud, and erected stone fortresses to protect their villages. An example of such fortresses is Pucará de Tilcara, Pucará meaning "fortress" (word also used for the Argentine combat aircraft Pucara). Omaguacas and Ocloyas were later conquered by the Incas during their expansion period.

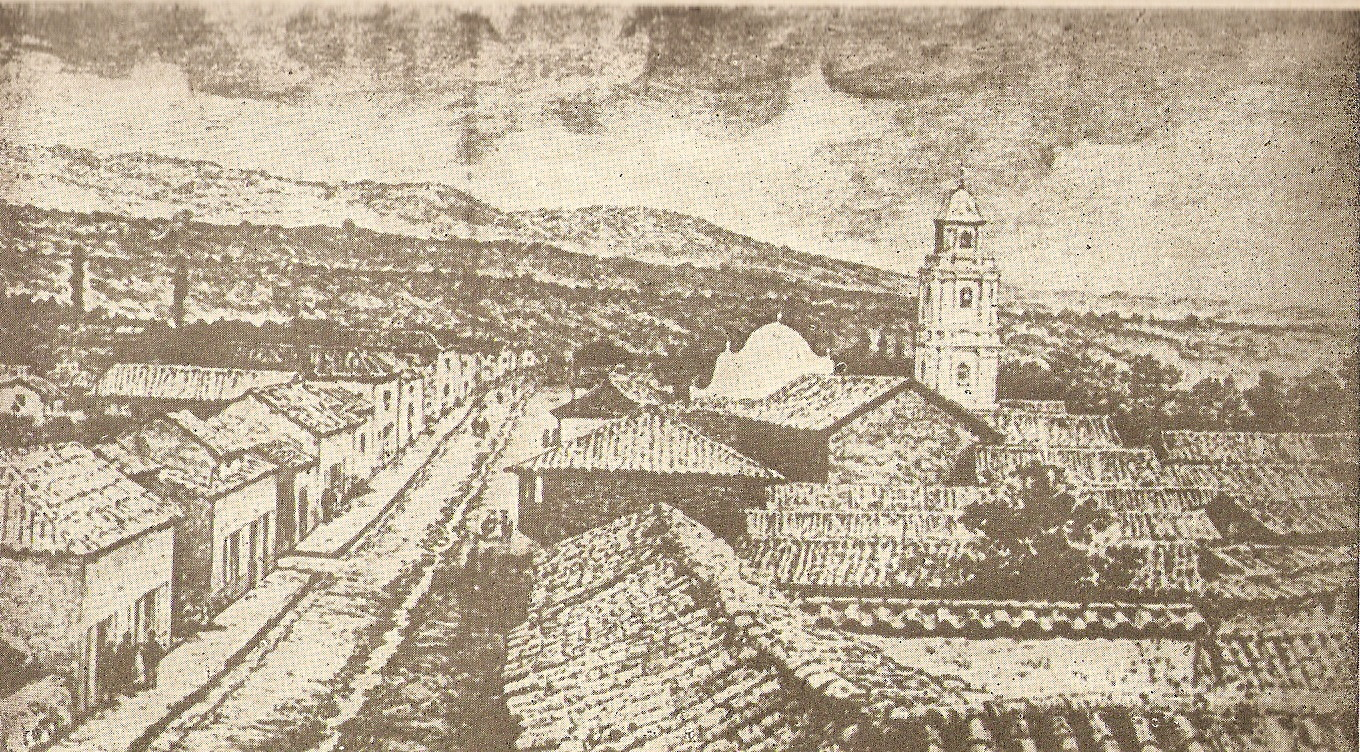
A view of Jujuy at the end of the 19th century. Clearly highlights the bell tower of Iglesia Matriz

The name Jujuy derives from a type of Inca provincial governor (xuxuyoc) encountered there by the Spanish in the late 16th century.

In 1593, a small settlement (current San Salvador de Jujuy) was erected in the Jujuy valley by the effort of Francisco de Argañaraz y Murguía. Colonial forces fought the resistance by the indigenous Calchaquíes and Omaguacas, so that the European population eventually consolidated in the village.

At the end of the 17th century, the customs to the Viceroyalty of Peru was transferred from Córdoba to Jujuy.

With the separation from Peru and the creation of the Viceroyalty of the Río de la Plata, Jujuy lost its importance and its population started to diminish.

During the May Revolution and the battles for the independence of the United provinces of the South, many confrontations took place in Jujuy because the Spanish concentrated their forces in Peru. The people of Jujuy had to endure the Jujuy Exodus, a massive evacuation with a scorched earth policy, led by General Manuel Belgrano. Eventually the Spanish surrendered, but the war had seriously affected the economy of the area.

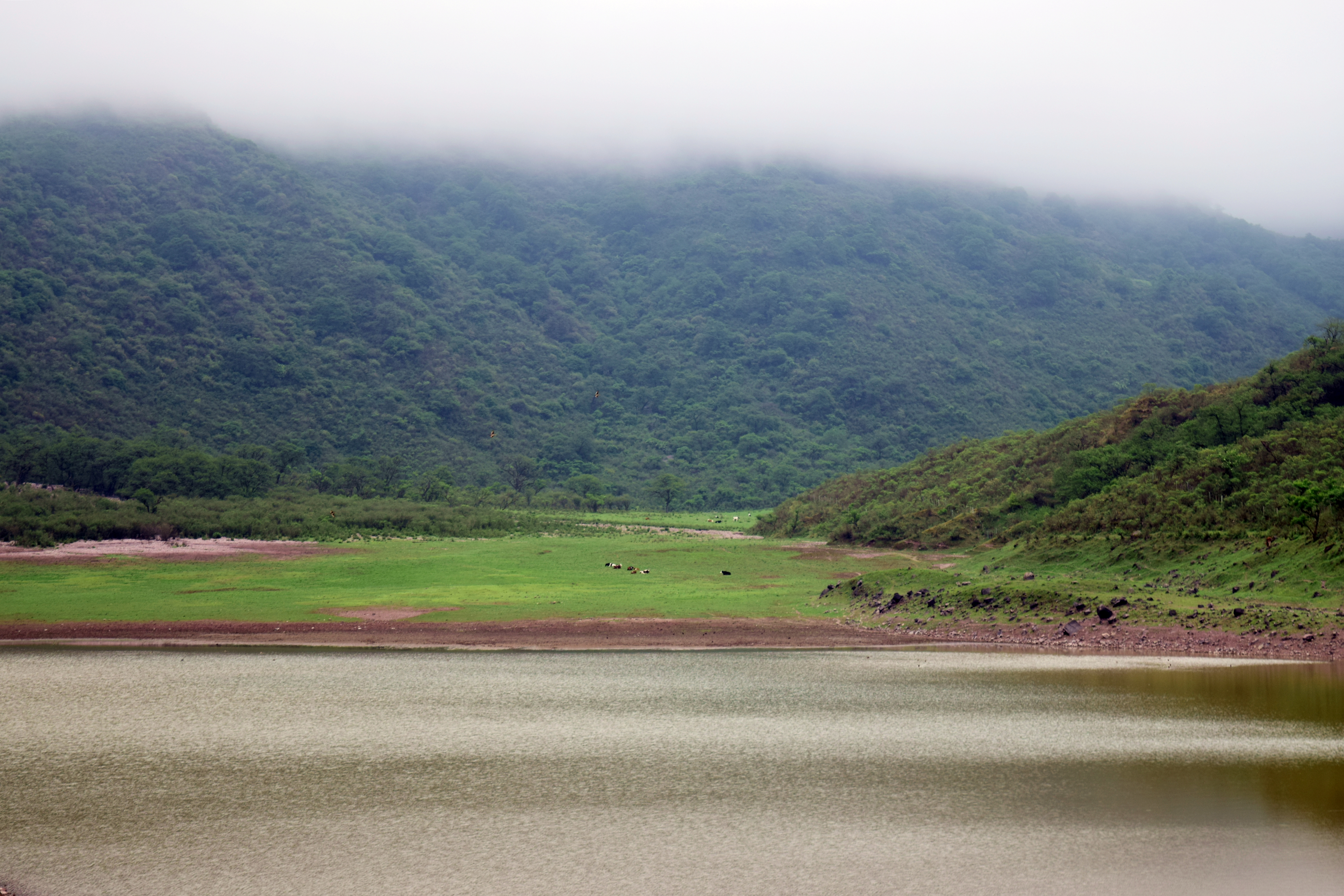
View of the Yala Lake.

After a series of internal conflicts, the province declared its autonomy from Tucumán and Salta Provinces on November 18, 1834. Jujuy started a gradual process of economic and social improvement, and at the end of the 19th century the sugarcane industry arose. At the beginning of the 20th century, the railway connected the province with Buenos Aires, and La Paz, Bolivia.

In 1945, heavy industry first arrived in Jujuy at the hand of General Manuel Savio, a presidential economic advisor who, had Argentina's first modern steel mill installed in Jujuy. In 1969, Jujuy joined oil-rich neighboring Salta Province with the discovery of petroleum by the state-owned YPF.

The Gobernador Horacio Guzmán International Airport has operated since 1967.

== Indigenous people ==
The Colla people are indigenous people who have been living in Jujuy for centuries, practicing subsistence living, farming with llamas and goats. A group of small producers from Suqueños have been fighting in defense of Pachamama and their rights as members of Atacama people. Thirty-three villages have united to oppose the lithium extraction as it requires much water which the region has very little of. As of 2019, at a single salt lake 10 billion liters of water were being pumped up from 450 meter depth into solar ponds. They also claim that lithium operations have contaminated the air with residuals of chemicals used to extract lithium, such as lye, hydrated sodium carbonate and others. The dust irritates the eyes of llamas and can cause blindness.

== Economy ==
Jujuy's economy is moderately underdeveloped, yet very diversified. Its 2006 economy was an estimated US$2.998 billion, or, US$4,899 per capita (over 40% below the national average).

=== Agriculture ===
Jujuy is, despite its rural profile, not particularly agrarian. Agriculture contributes about 10% to output and the main agricultural activity is sugarcane. Its processing represents more than half of the province's gross production, and 30% of the national sugar production. The second agricultural activity is tobacco, cultivated in the Southeastern valley, as a major national producer.

Other crops include beans, citrus and tomatoes, and other vegetables for local consumption. Cattle and goats are raised on a small scale, mainly for local dairies, and llamas, vicuñas and guanacos are raised in significant numbers for wool.

Manufacturing is more prominent in Jujuy than in some neighboring provinces, adding 15% to its economy. Jujuy is the second largest Argentine producer of iron, used by the Altos Hornos Zapla steel mill.

=== Mining ===
Other industrial activities include mining for construction material, petroleum extraction at Caimancito, salt production from Salinas Grandes salt basin, and paper production fed by the Jujuy's forests with 20% of the industrial product of the province.

Argentina is the world's second largest lithium brine producer which is located in Jujuy (e. g. Salar de Olaroz and Salinas Grandes mines). The so-called Lithium Triangle, consisting of NW Argentina, Bolivia and NE Chile holds more than half the world's supply.

== Tourism ==
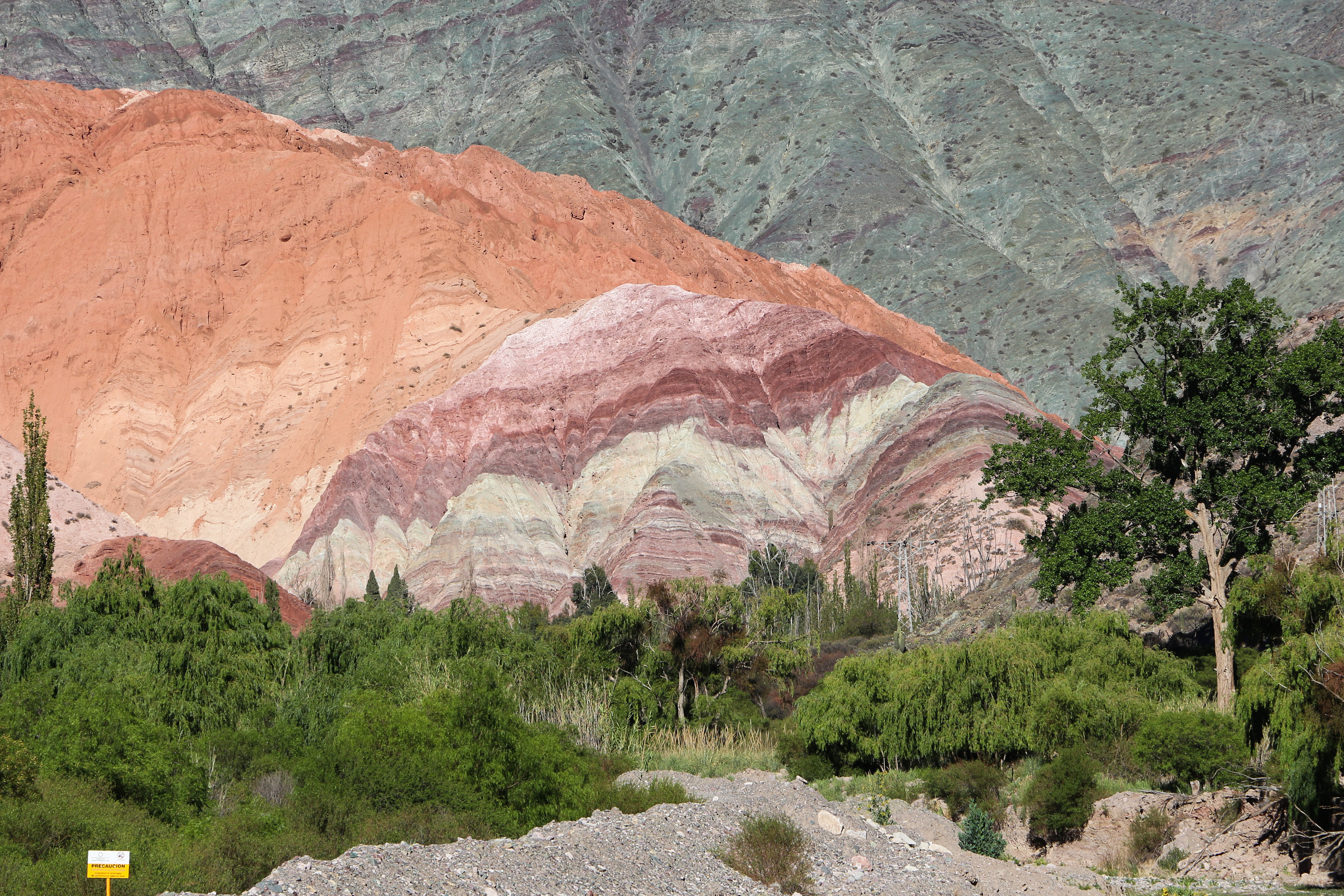
The Quebrada de Humahuaca was declared World Heritage Site by UNESCO on July 2, 2003.

After the financial crisis of 2001 in Argentina, citizens were encouraged to explore their own country as opposed to travelling abroad. Tourism in the area is still a growing activity and brings a number of Argentine tourists (80%), tourists from other South American countries (12%) and Europeans (7%). Most tourists head for San Salvador de Jujuy to start their exploration of the province. The Horacio Guzmán International Airport, 34 km from San Salvador, connects the province with Buenos Aires, Córdoba, and some destinations in Bolivia.

Apart from the fantastic contrast of land colours and formations, tourists are attracted also by the strong aboriginal roots in the culture of Jujuy. Salta wineries growing in popularity have attracted tourists, combining province traditions with "cosmopolitan culture". Aymará and Quechua cultures coexist in the area, and ruins of the Incas are well conserved.

Tourists who come to Jujuy visit the area of the Quebrada de Humahuaca and its Cerro de los Siete Colores, Pucará de Tilcara, Salinas Grandes and many small towns. Other less frequent destinations include the Calilegua National Park in the Yungas jungle, La Quiaca, Laguna de Pozuelos, and Laguna Guayatayoc.

== Government ==
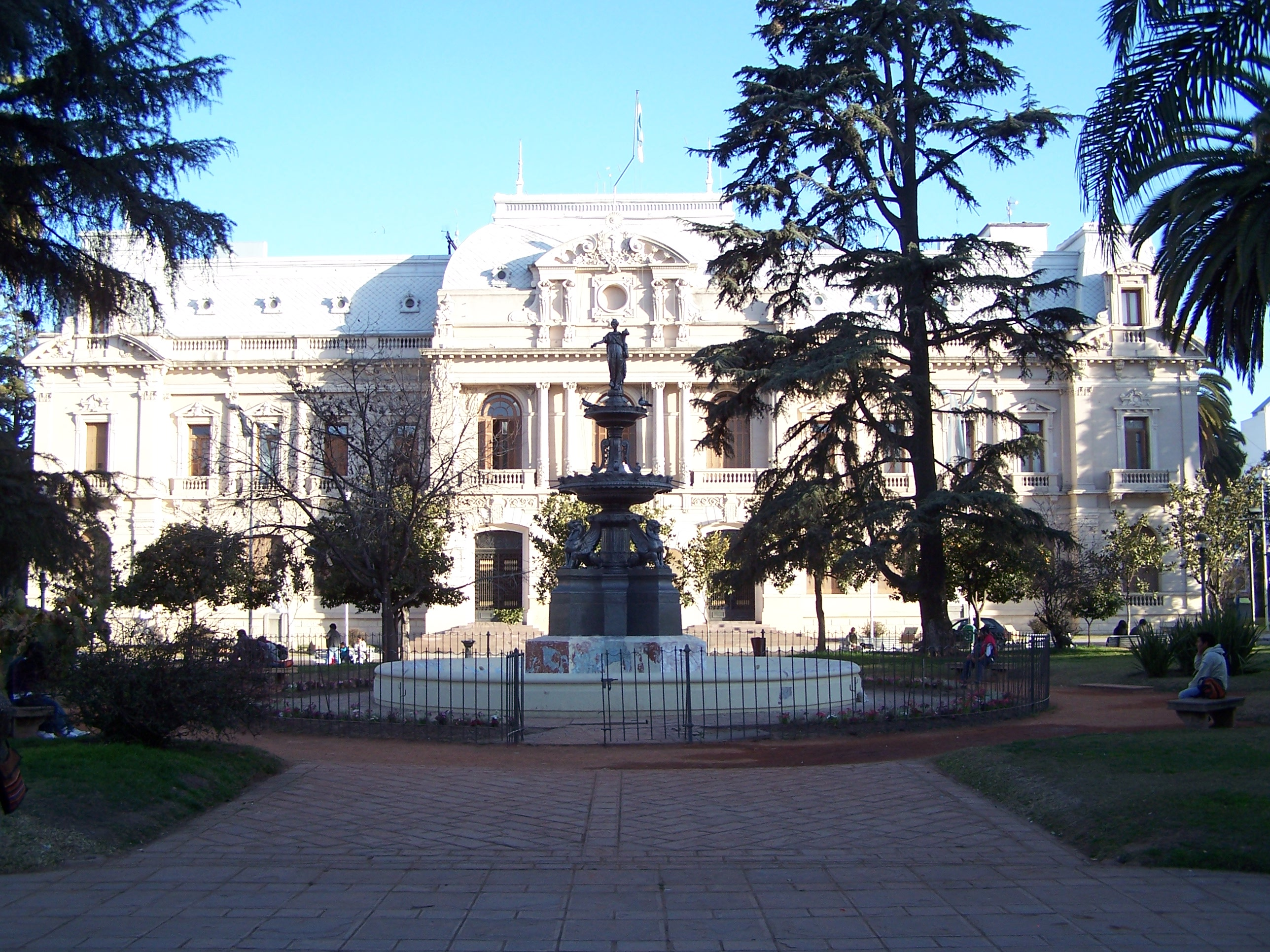
The Jujuy Government Palace.

The provincial government is divided into the usual three branches: the executive, headed by a popularly elected governor, who appoint the cabinet; the legislative; and the judiciary, headed by the Supreme Court. The Constitution of Jujuy Province forms the formal law of the province.

In Argentina, the most important law enforcement organization is the Argentine Federal Police but the additional work is carried out by the Jujuy Provincial Police.

== Departments ==
The province is divided into 16 departments (in the Spanish language, departamentos).

Department (Capital):

- Cochinoca (Abra Pampa)
- El Carmen (El Carmen)
- Doctor Manuel Belgrano (San Salvador de Jujuy)
- Humahuaca (Humahuaca)
- Ledesma (Libertador General San Martín)
- Palpalá (Palpalá)
- Rinconada (Rinconada)
- San Antonio (San Antonio, Jujuy)
- San Pedro (San Pedro)
- Santa Bárbara (Palma Sola, Jujuy)
- Santa Catalina (Santa Catalina)
- Susques (Susques)
- Tilcara (Tilcara)
- Tumbaya (Tumbaya)
- Valle Grande (Valle Grande)
- Yavi (La Quiaca)

== Towns and villages ==
- Barrios
- El Cóndor
- El Talar
- Guerrero
- La Almona
- Llulluchayoc
- Pampa Blanca
- San Francisco de la Nueva Provincia de Álava
- San José
- San Salvador de Jujuy

== In film ==
- Cocaine Wars, (1985).
- Veronico Cruz, (1988).
- My Masterpiece (2018), dir. Gastón Duprat.

== Gallery ==
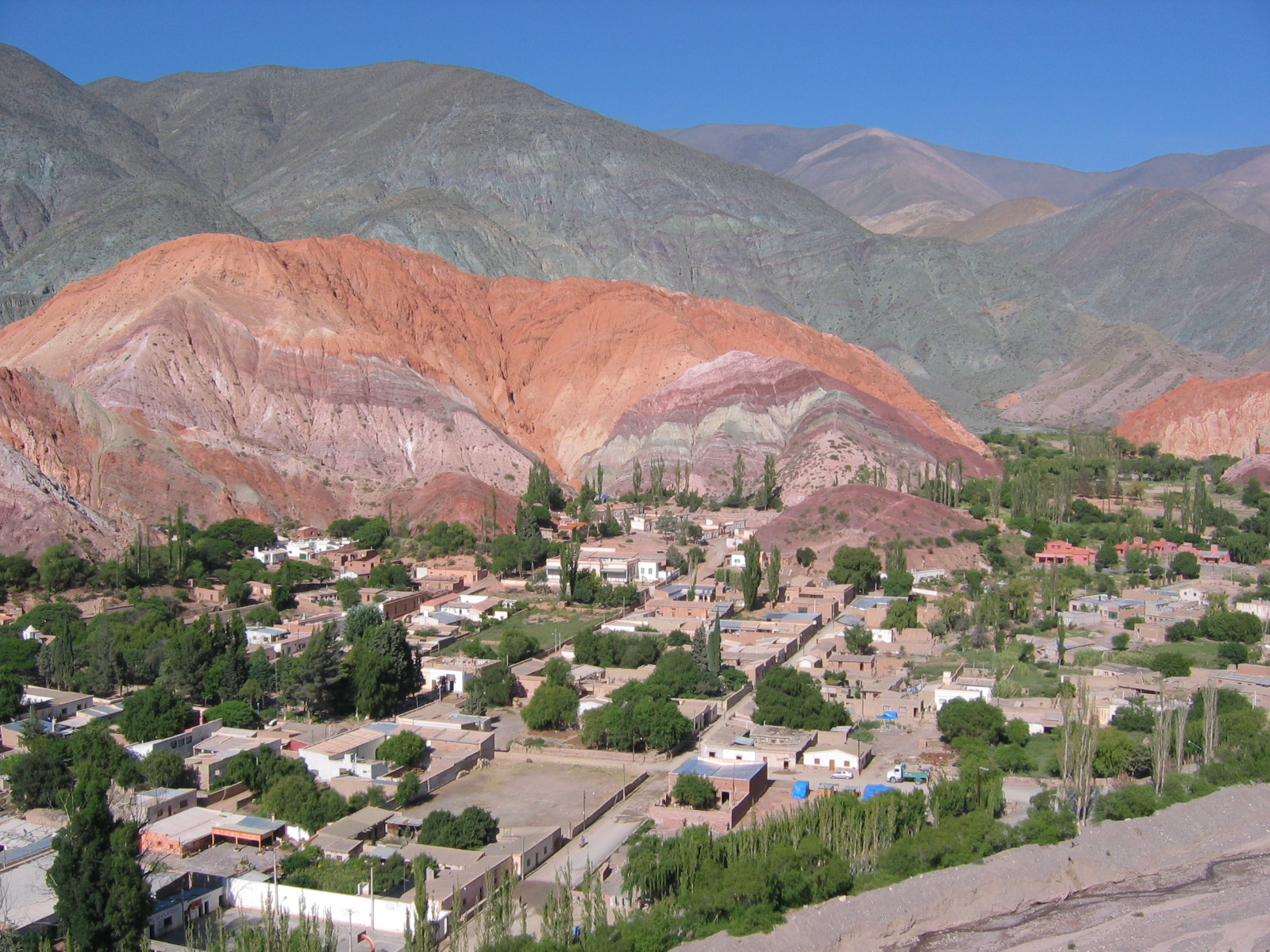
Cerro de los Siete Colores, Purmamarca.

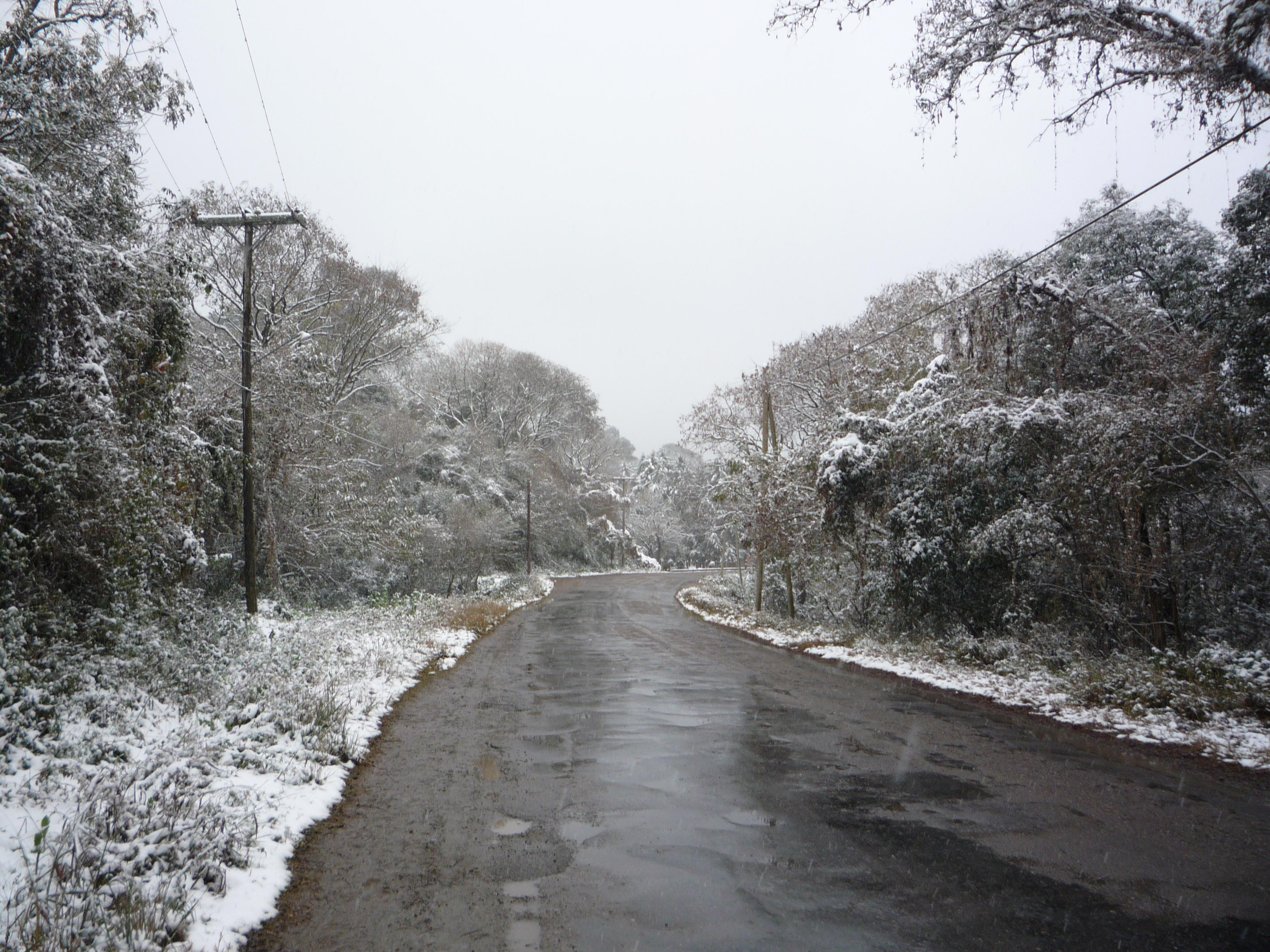
Snow on Provincial Route 56.

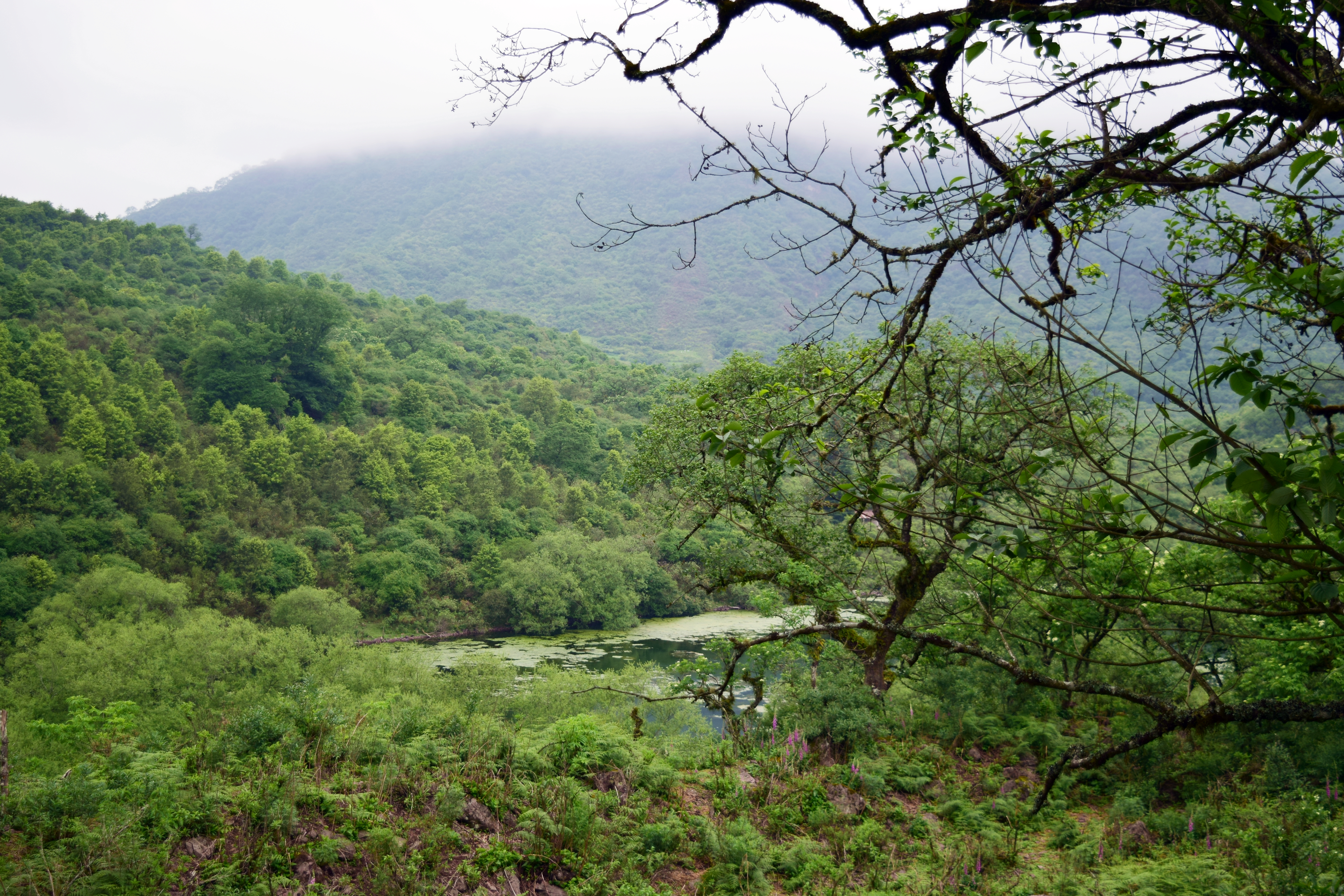
Potrero de Yala Provincial Park.

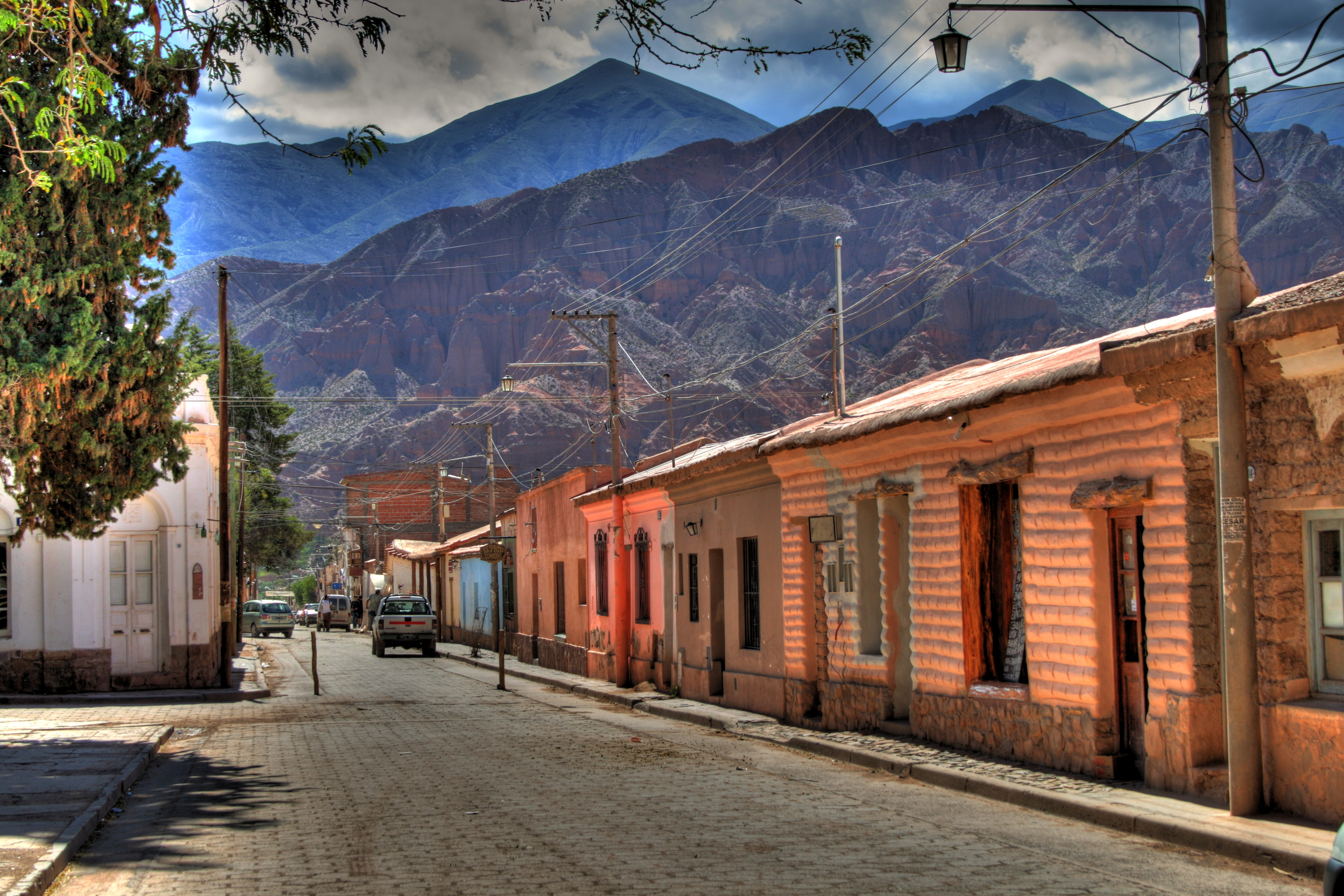
Calle de Tilcara, Jujuy.

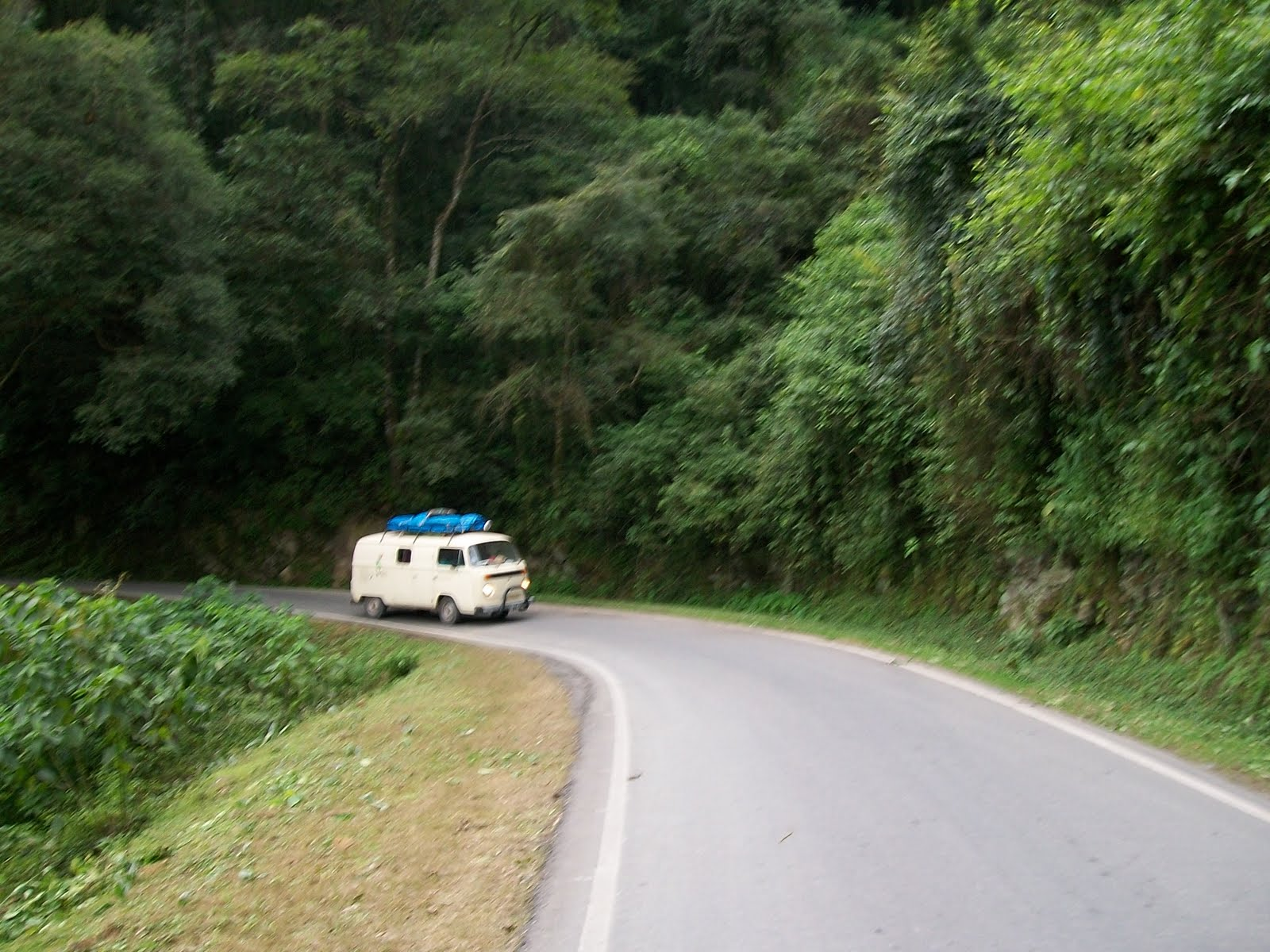
National Route 9 between Jujuy and Salta.

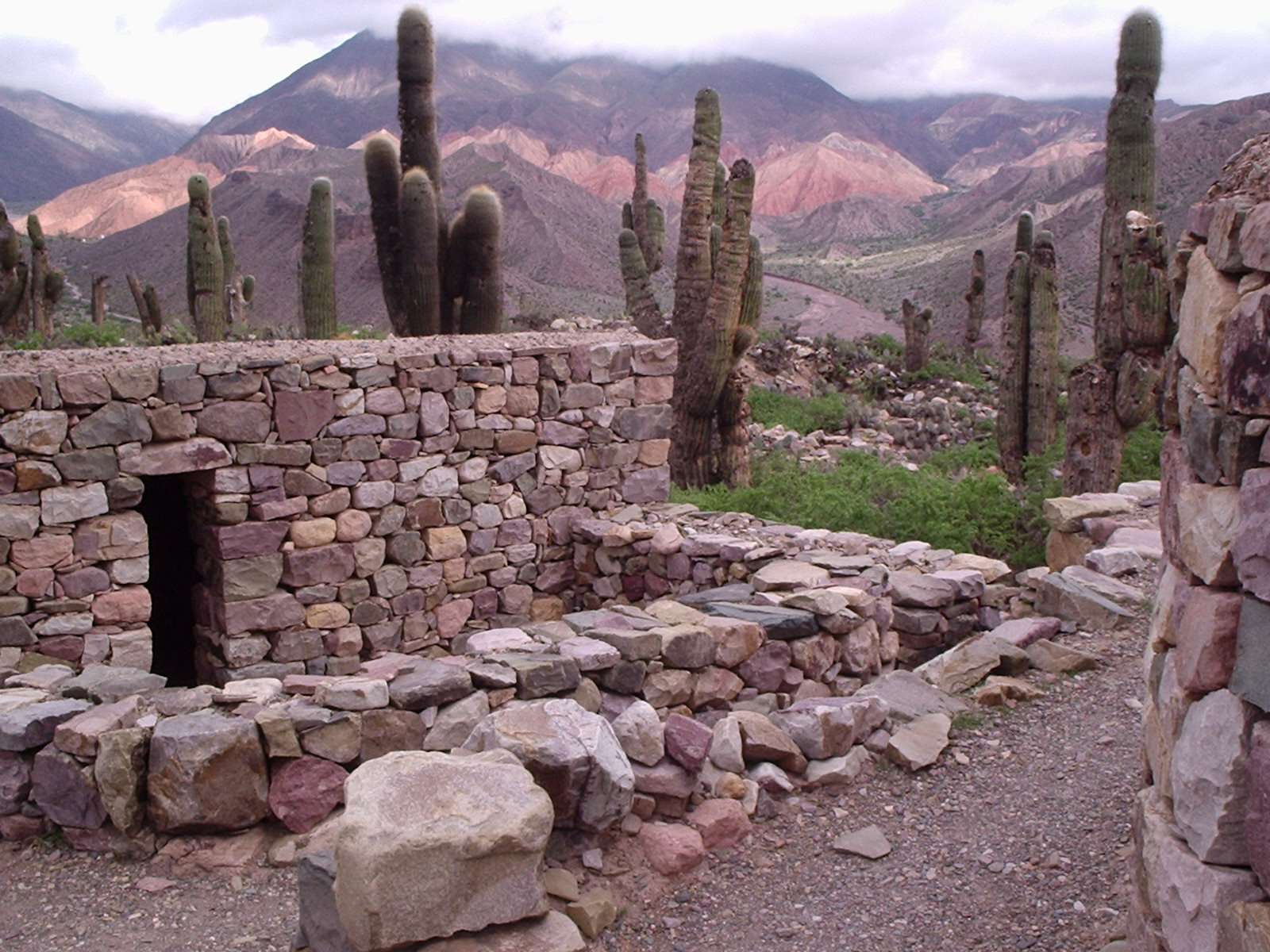
Ruins of the Pucará near Tilcara.

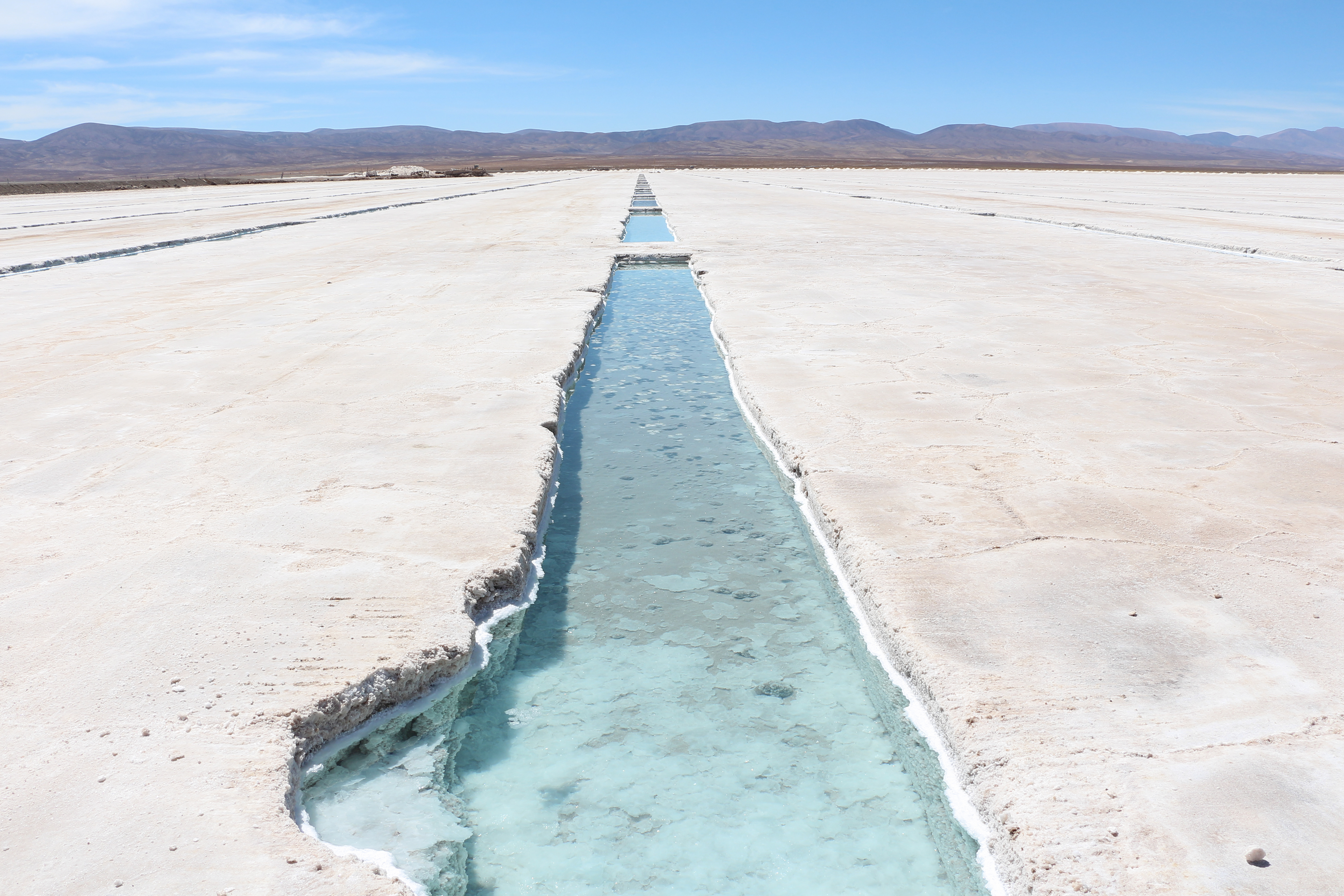
Salinas Grandes, Jujuy.

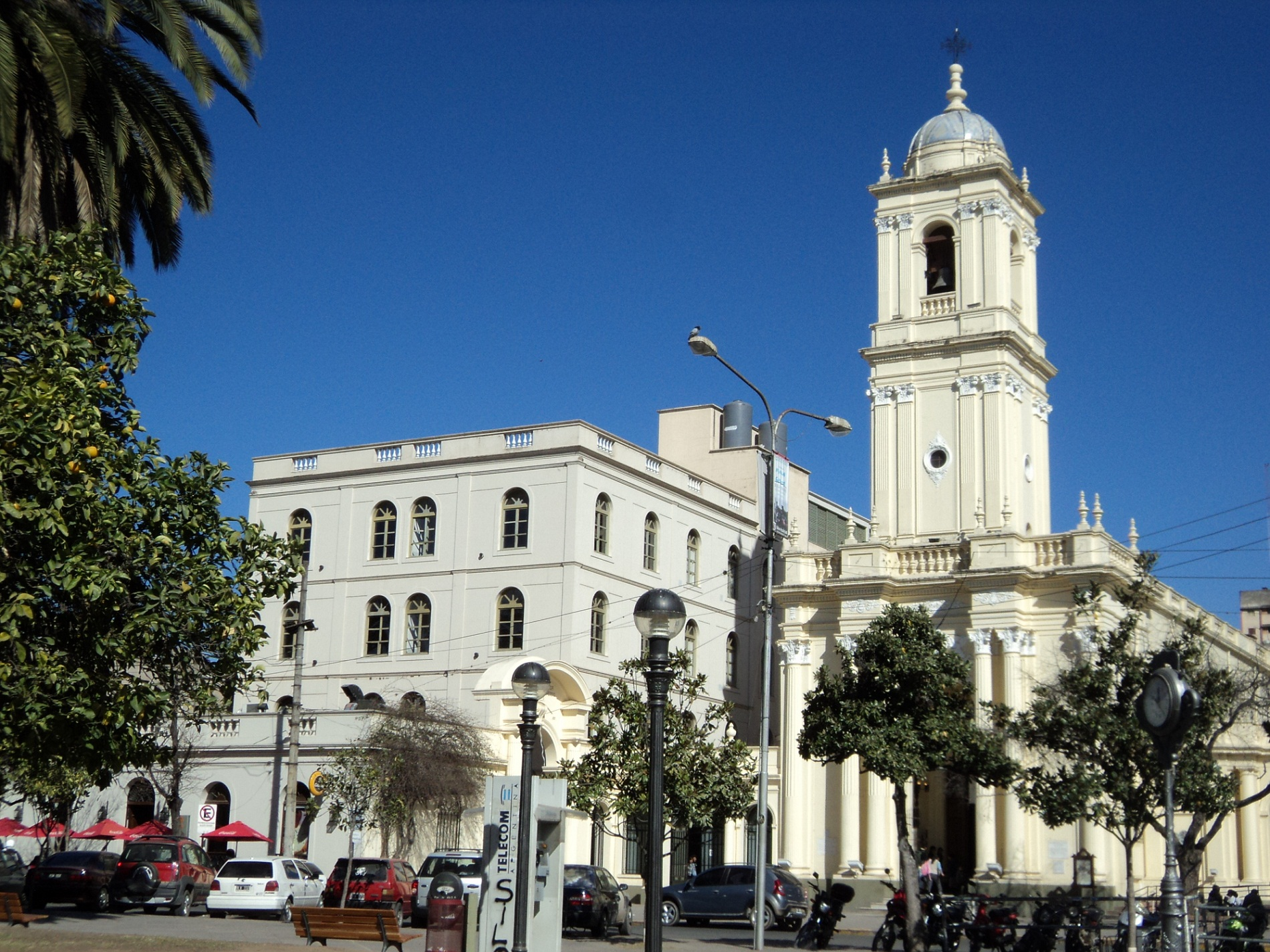
Cathedral Basilica of the Holy Saviour in San Salvador de Jujuy.

== See also ==
- 1863 Jujuy earthquake
- Salar de Atacama
- Gigafactory 1 requiring vast amounts of lithium
