= Talar, Hormozgan =

Talar طالار
- Village
- Location within Iran
- Coordinates: 27°03′06″N 57°03′52″E
- Country: Iran
- Province: Hormozgan
- County: Minab
- Bakhsh: Central
- Rural District: Howmeh

Population (2006)
  - Total: 421
- Time zone: UTC+3:30 (IRST)
  - Summer (DST): UTC+4:30 (IRDT)

Talar (Persian: طالار, also Romanized as Ţālār; also known as Talvār) is a village in Howmeh Rural District, in the Central District of Minab County, Hormozgan Province, Iran. At the 2006 census, its population was 421, in 80 families.
