= Valle Grande Department =

Valle Grande Departamento Valle Grande
- Department
- Interactive map of Valle Grande
- Country: Argentina
- Seat: Valle Grande

Area
  - Total: 962 km^{2} (371 sq mi)

Population (2022)
  - Total: 2,509
  - Density: 2.61/km^{2} (6.75/sq mi)

Valle Grande is a department of the province of Jujuy (Argentina).
