= Pucará, Vallegrande =

Pucará
- Town
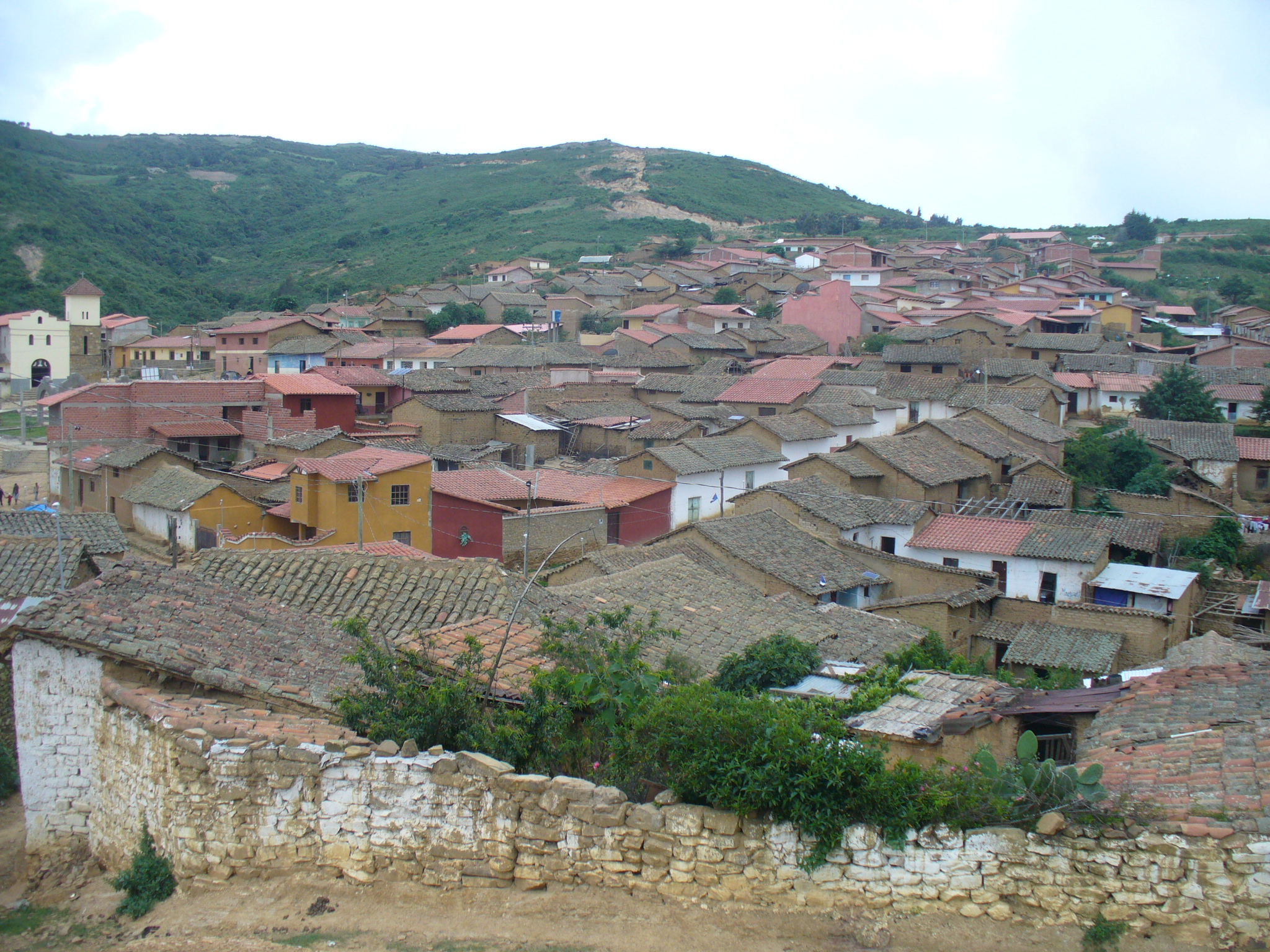

- Location in Bolivia
- Coordinates: 18°42′54″S 64°11′04″W
- Country: Bolivia
- Department: Santa Cruz Department
- Province: Vallegrande Province
- Municipality: Pucará Municipality
- Canton: Pucará Canton

Population (2001)
  - Total: 795
- Time zone: UTC-4 (BOT)
- Climate: Cwb

Pucará is a small town in Bolivia.
