= Vallegrande Province =

Province in Santa Cruz Department, Bolivia

Provincia Vallegrande
- Province
- Interactive map of Provincia Vallegrande
- Coordinates: 18.667°S 64.000°W
- Country: Bolivia
- Department: Santa Cruz

Area
  - Total: 6,414 km^{2} (2,476 sq mi)

Population (2001)
  - Total: 27,429
  - Density: 4.276/km^{2} (11.08/sq mi)
- ISO 3166 code: BO.SC.VG

Vallegrande is a province in the Santa Cruz Department, Bolivia. Its capital is Vallegrande. Around 2012 it held 0.5% of the wine and singani grapes planted in Bolivia, far behind the main wine-making districts of the Central Valley of Tarija and Cinti Valley.

== Subdivision ==
The province is divided into 5 municipios (municipalities):

Municipality	Area km^{2}	Seat	Population (2007)
Pucará	619	Pucará	2,445
Moro Moro	952	Moro Moro	2,982
Postrer Valle	1,059	Postrer Valle	3,006
Trigal	217	Trigal	2,467
Vallegrande	3,567	Vallegrande	17,082

== See also ==
- La Higuera
