= Tilcara =

San Francisco de Tilcara
- City
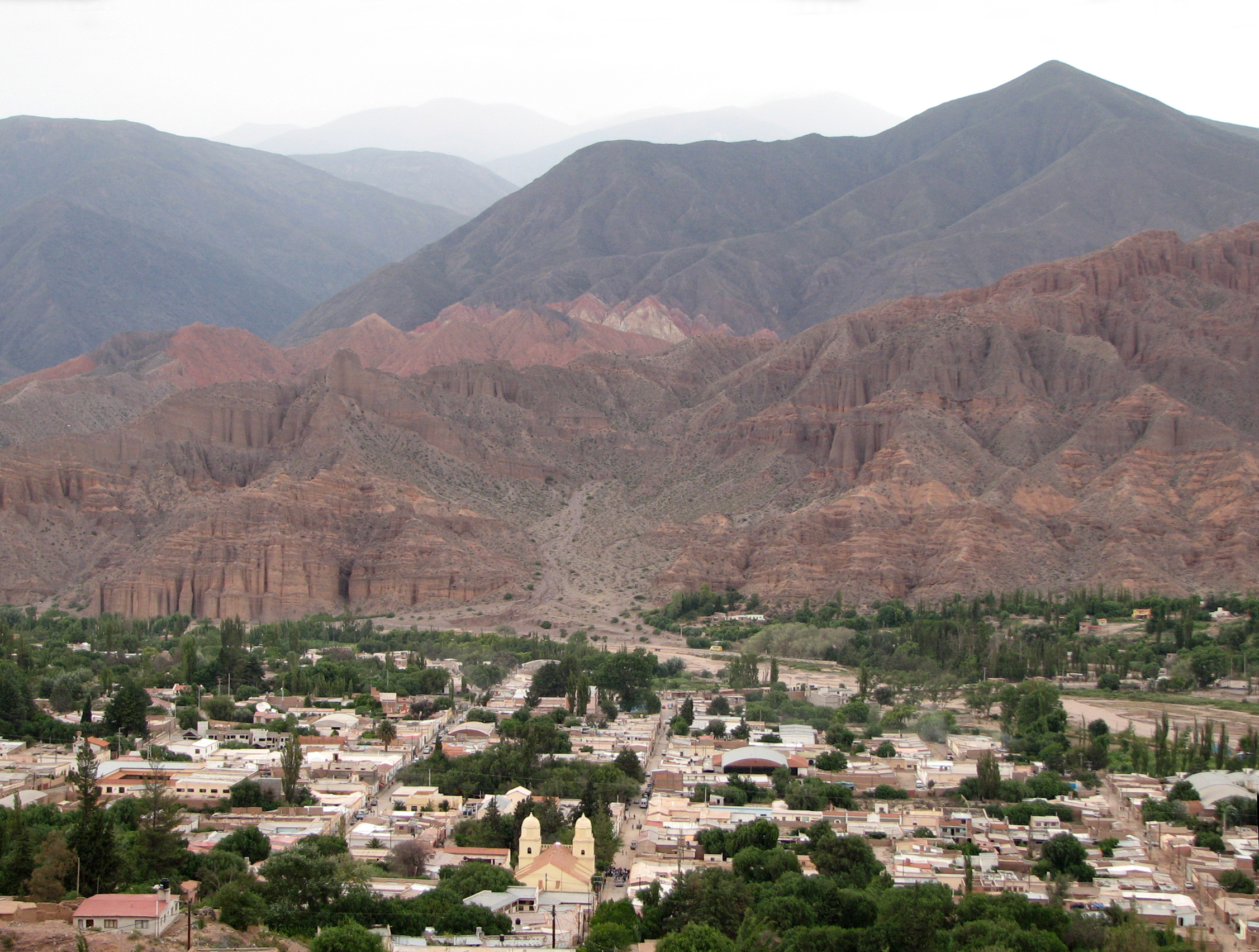

- Location of San Francisco de Tilcara in Argentina
- Coordinates: 23°34′S 65°22′W
- Country: Argentina
- Province: Jujuy
- Department: Tilcara

Government
  - Intendant: Ricardo Romero (PJ)

Area
  - Total: 1.2 km^{2} (0.46 sq mi)
- Elevation: 2,465 m (8,087 ft)

Population (2010 census)
  - Total: 6,249
  - Density: 5,200/km^{2} (13,000/sq mi)
- Demonym: tilcareño/a
- Time zone: UTC−3 (ART)
- CPA base: Y4624
- Dialing code: +54 388

San Francisco de Tilcara (usually referred to as Tilcara) is a city in the province of Jujuy, Argentina, and the head town of the Tilcara Department. It had 6,249 inhabitants at the 2010 census [INDEC]. Traces of human habitation in the area date back more than 10,000 years, making it one of the oldest continuously inhabited settlements of Argentina.

Tilcara is located 84 km from the provincial capital, San Salvador de Jujuy, beside National Route 9, at about 2,500 m above sea level, well within the first heights of the Andes.

The area features dramatic mountainous landscapes and rich aboriginal traditions, which make it a major tourist attraction in northwestern Argentina, with several nearby hiking tracks also attracting visitors.

Possibly the biggest attraction in Tilcara is the nearby Pucará de Tilcara, the partially reconstructed ruins of a pre-Inca pukara, Quechua for "fortress", located a few kilometers away from the city of Tilcara on a hill with an impressive view of the valley of the Río Grande.

The city is known in Argentina for hosting the Argentina national football team in a pre-World Cup camp in January 1986. Tilcara was chosen in order to train in altitude, in conditions similar to the ones Argentina would have face in Mexico that summer.

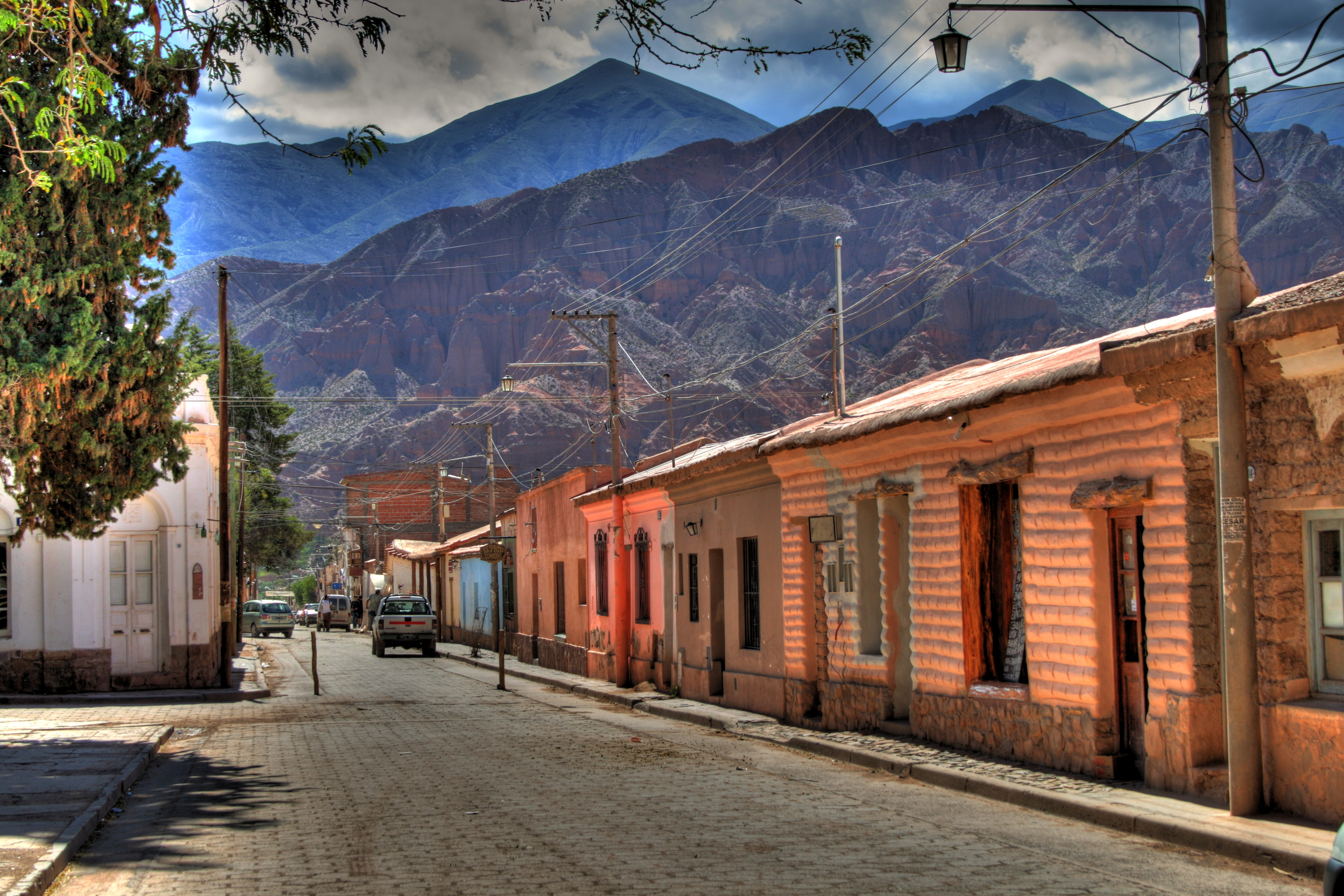
Calle de Tilcara

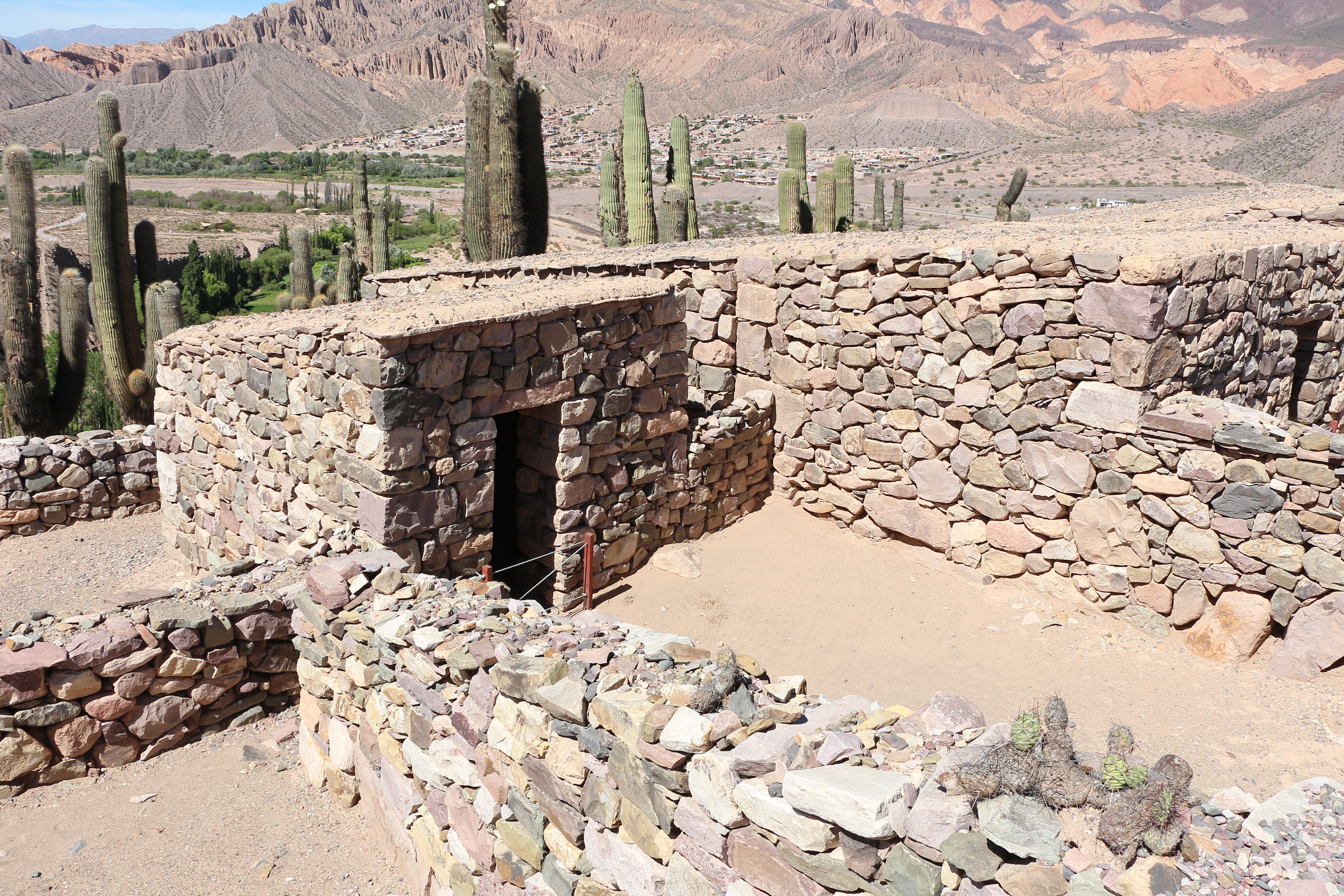
Pucará de Tilcara

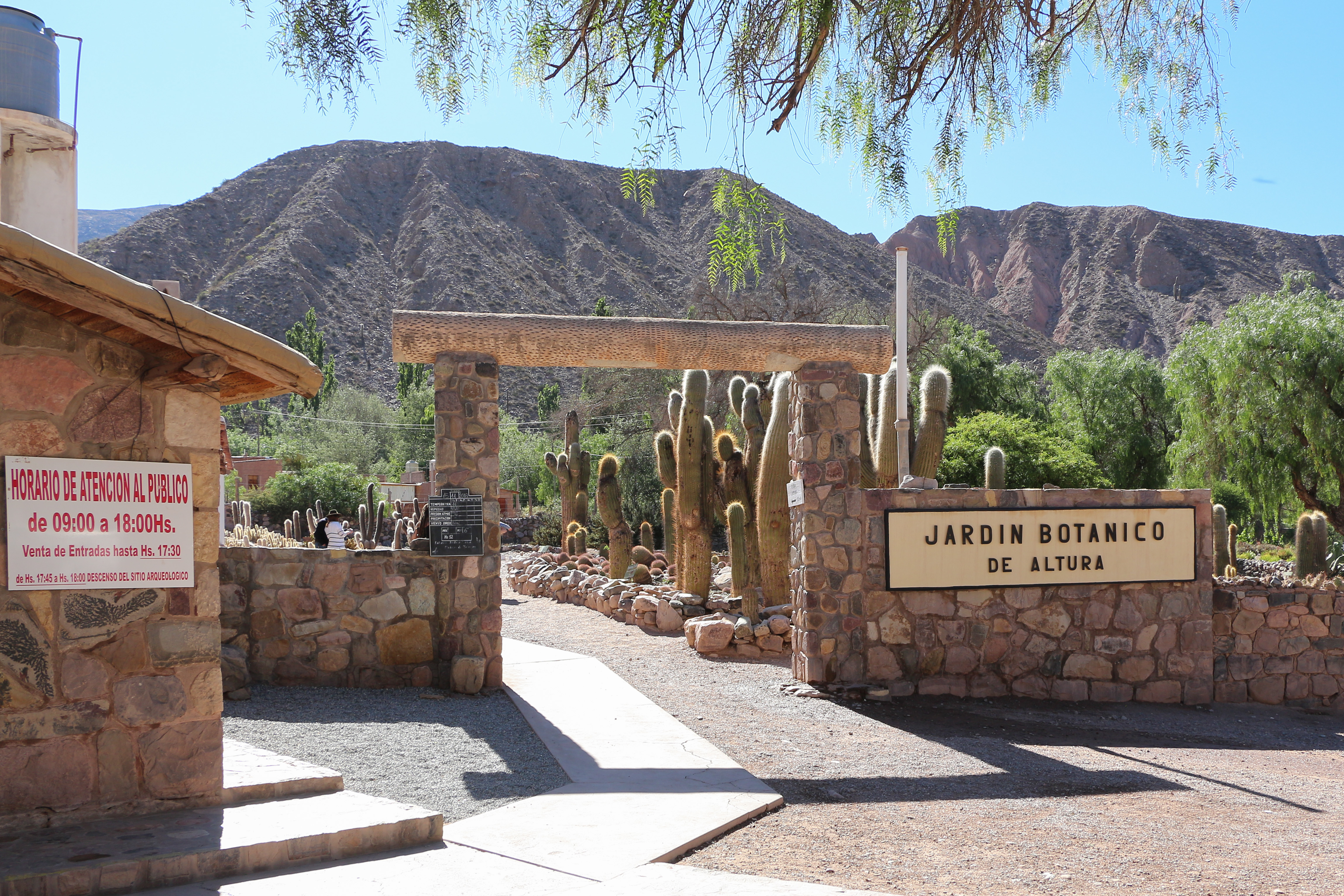
Jardín Botánico de Altura

== Geography ==
=== Climate ===
Climate data for Tilcara (1934-1990)
Month	Jan	Feb	Mar	Apr	May	Jun	Jul	Aug	Sep	Oct	Nov	Dec	Year
Daily mean °C (°F)	17.1 (62.8)	16.6 (61.9)	15.6 (60.1)	13.0 (55.4)	9.9 (49.8)	7.5 (45.5)	7.1 (44.8)	9.3 (48.7)	11.7 (53.1)	14.5 (58.1)	16.1 (61.0)	17.0 (62.6)	13.0 (55.4)
Average precipitation mm (inches)	42 (1.7)	35 (1.4)	18 (0.7)	3 (0.1)	0 (0)	1 (0.0)	0 (0)	1 (0.0)	1 (0.0)	4 (0.2)	9 (0.4)	23 (0.9)	137 (5.4)
Source: Instituto Nacional de Tecnología Agropecuaria

- Köppen classification: BWk (Cool Arid Climate)
- Thermal amplitude: 9.5 °C (17.1 °F)
- Maximum average temperature: 30 °C or 86 °F (January)
- Average minimum temperature: 4 °C or 39.2 °F (July)
- Average annual temperature: between 12 and 14 °C (53.6 and 57.2 °F)
- Average annual rainfall: 137 millimetres or 5.39 inches (almost entirely between November and March)
