= El Talar, Jujuy =

Coordinates: 23°34′S 64°22′W

El Talar (Jujuy)
- Municipality and town
- Interactive map of El Talar (Jujuy)
- Country: Argentina
- Province: Jujuy Province
- Time zone: UTC−3 (ART)

El Talar (Jujuy) is a town and municipality in Jujuy Province in Argentina.
