= Valle Grande, Argentina =

Valle Grande
- Village
- Location within Argentina
- Coordinates: 23°38′34″S 64°56′55″W
- Country: Argentina
- Province: Jujuy
- Department: Valle Grande
- Elevation: 2,313 m (7,589 ft)

Population (2001 Census)
  - Total: 552
- Time zone: UTC−3 (ART)
- CPA Base: Y 4513
- Area code: +54 388
- Climate: Dfc

Valle Grande is a village and the capital of the eponymous Valle Grande Department of Jujuy Province, Argentina.
