= Vallegrande =

- Town
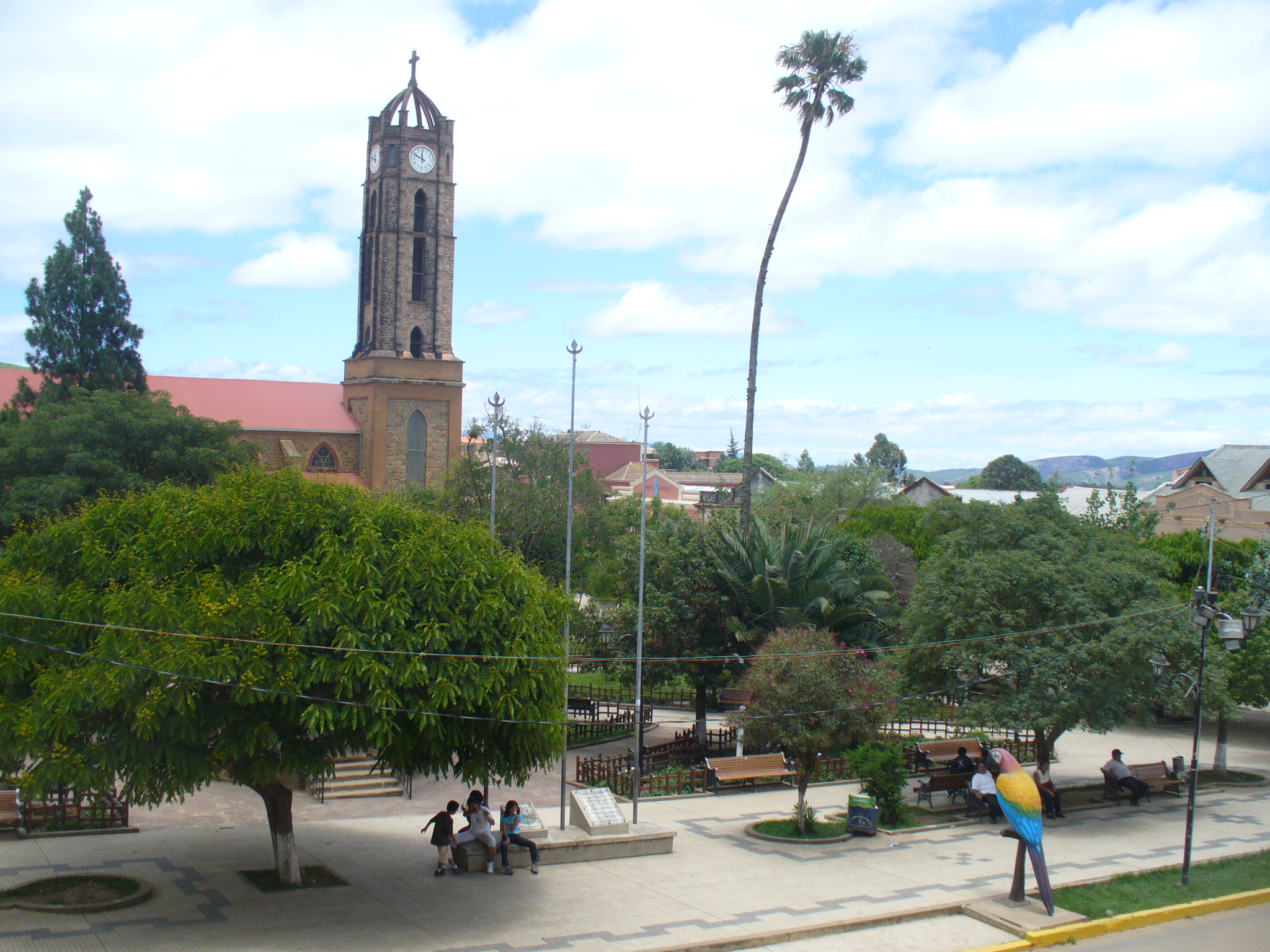
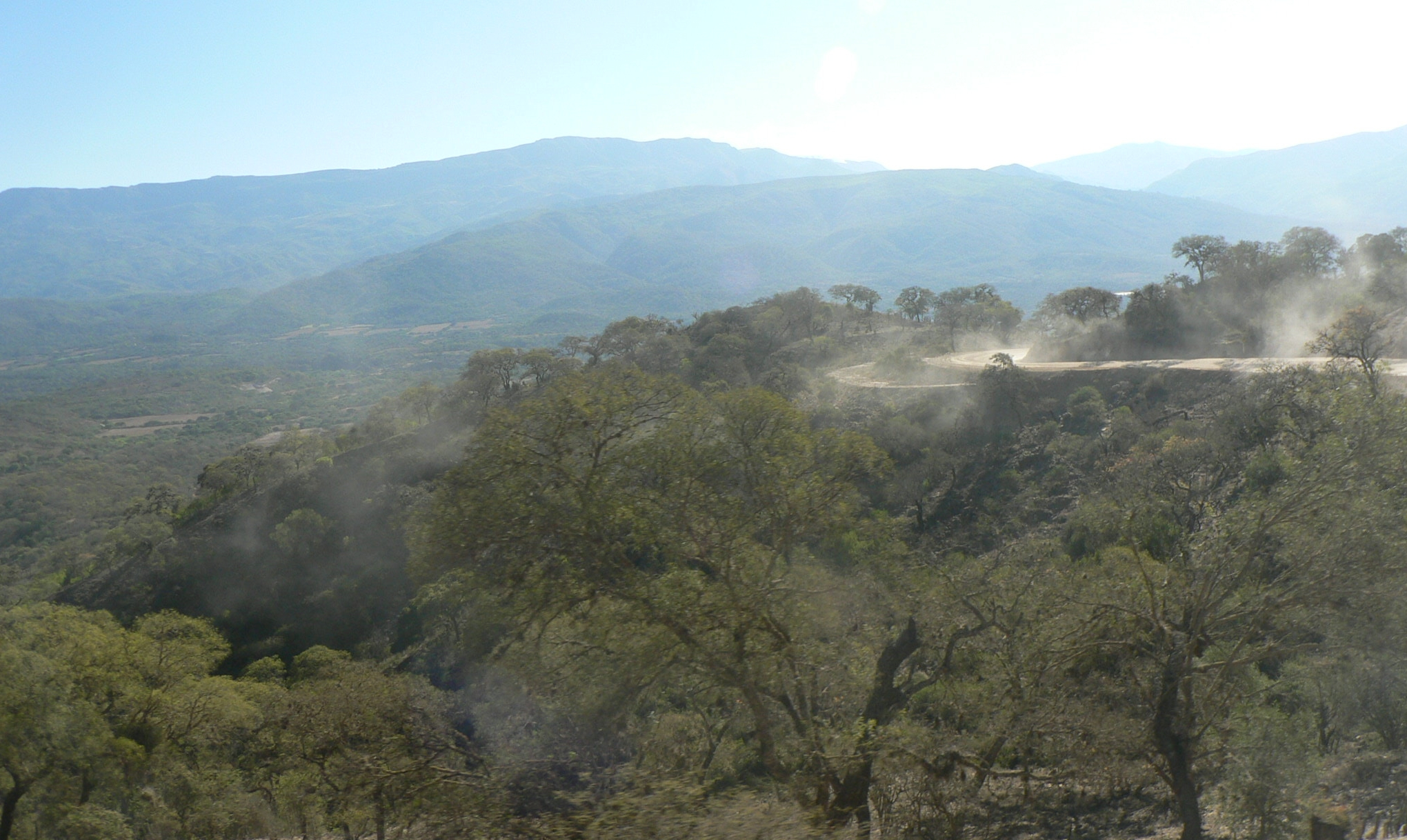
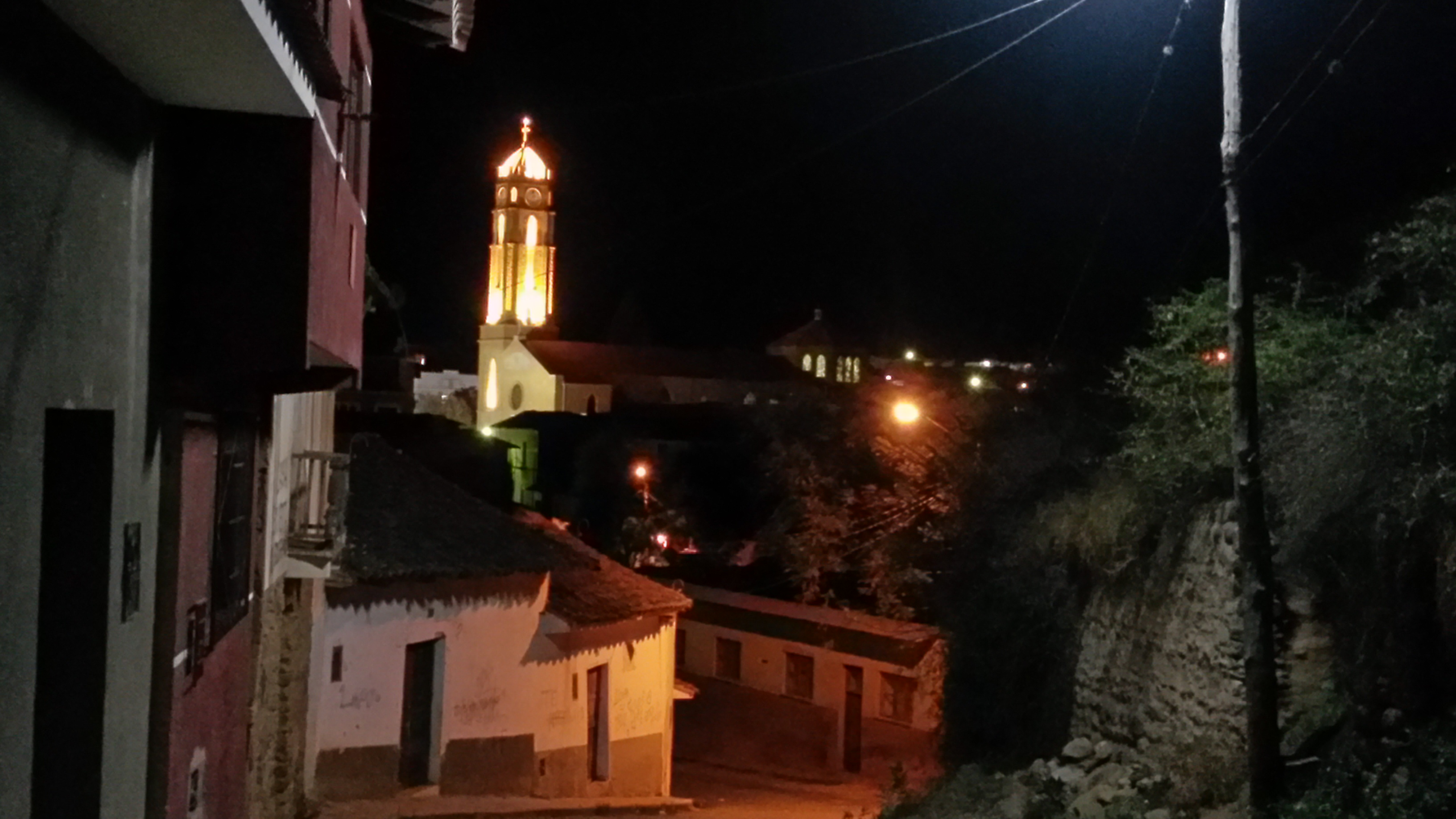
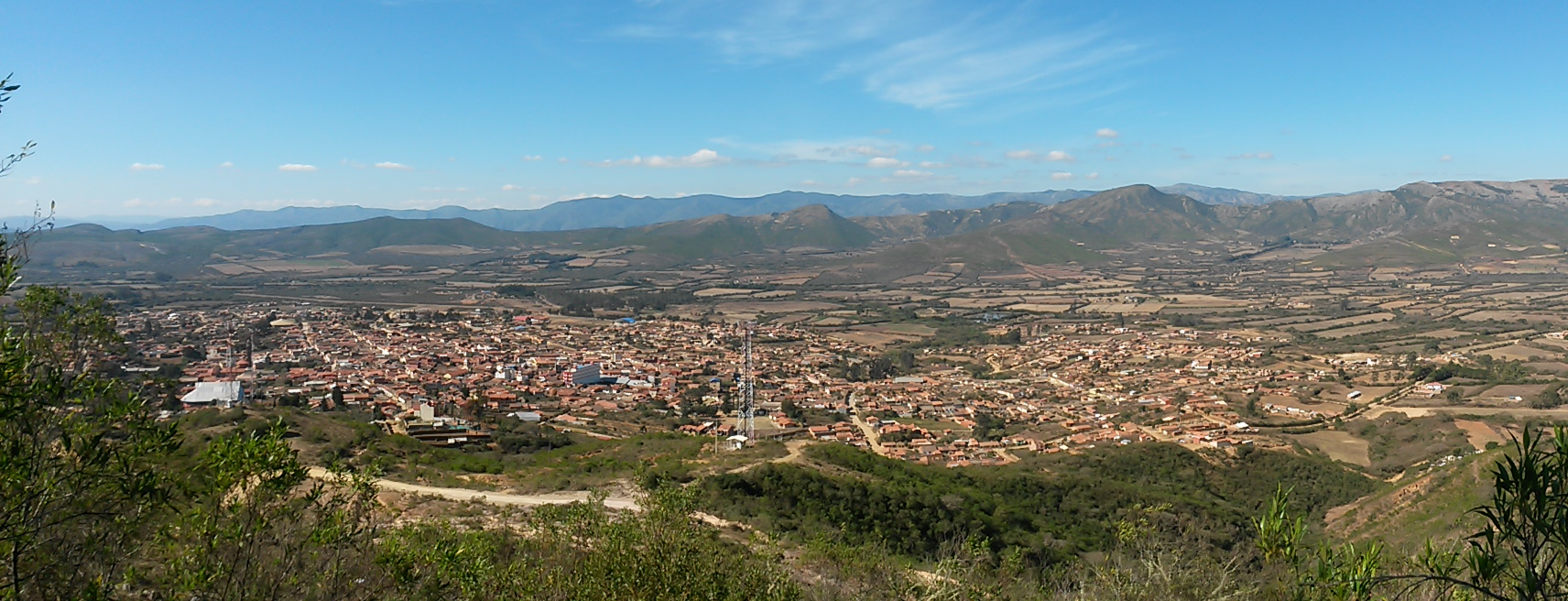

- Flag

- Location in Bolivia
- Coordinates: 18°29′S 64°06′W
- Country: Bolivia
- Department: Santa Cruz Department
- Province: Vallegrande
- Municipality: Vallegrande
- Canton: Vallegrande
- Elevation: 2,030 m (6,660 ft)

Population (2001)
  - Total: 6,000
- Time zone: UTC-4 (BOT)
- Climate: Cwb

Vallegrande (Spanish, meaning 'Big Valley') is a small colonial town in Bolivia, located in the Department of Santa Cruz, some 125 km (78 miles) southwest of Santa Cruz de la Sierra. It is the capital of the Vallegrande Province and Vallegrande Municipality and serves as a regionally important market town.

The town was the first burial site of revolutionary Che Guevara, after his 1967 execution.

== Geography ==
=== Overview ===
The town lies in a big valley (hence the name) at an altitude of 2,030 m (6,660 ft) and has approximately 6,000 inhabitants. It has a mild temperate climate due mainly to its valley location, altitude, and the cold winter fronts the sweep the plains of Santa Cruz known as "Surazo".

=== Climate ===
Vallegrande has a subtropical highland climate (Köppen: Cwb). Temperatures are relatively temperate annually, with high levels of diurnal temperature variation due to the altitude. Precipitation falls mainly during summer storms, while winter is marked by a drying period.

== Climate ==
Climate data for Vallegrande (Capitán Av. Vidal Villagomez Toledo Airport), elevation 2,030 m (6,660 ft)
Month	Jan	Feb	Mar	Apr	May	Jun	Jul	Aug	Sep	Oct	Nov	Dec	Year
Record high °C (°F)	34.5 (94.1)	30.2 (86.4)	28.2 (82.8)	27.4 (81.3)	27.5 (81.5)	31.4 (88.5)	28.0 (82.4)	28.0 (82.4)	35.5 (95.9)	34.3 (93.7)	31.8 (89.2)	31.2 (88.2)	35.5 (95.9)
Mean daily maximum °C (°F)	23.4 (74.1)	22.8 (73.0)	22.4 (72.3)	21.4 (70.5)	20.4 (68.7)	20.3 (68.5)	19.8 (67.6)	21.4 (70.5)	23.0 (73.4)	23.7 (74.7)	23.9 (75.0)	23.8 (74.8)	22.2 (71.9)
Daily mean °C (°F)	18.4 (65.1)	17.9 (64.2)	17.7 (63.9)	16.5 (61.7)	14.9 (58.8)	14.3 (57.7)	13.4 (56.1)	14.7 (58.5)	16.4 (61.5)	17.8 (64.0)	18.3 (64.9)	18.7 (65.7)	16.6 (61.8)
Mean daily minimum °C (°F)	13.5 (56.3)	13.1 (55.6)	12.9 (55.2)	11.6 (52.9)	9.5 (49.1)	8.3 (46.9)	7.1 (44.8)	8.0 (46.4)	9.7 (49.5)	11.9 (53.4)	12.6 (54.7)	13.6 (56.5)	11.0 (51.8)
Record low °C (°F)	5.5 (41.9)	7.2 (45.0)	4.0 (39.2)	1.2 (34.2)	−2.0 (28.4)	−8.0 (17.6)	−5.0 (23.0)	−4.5 (23.9)	−1.5 (29.3)	−0.4 (31.3)	3.1 (37.6)	5.3 (41.5)	−8.0 (17.6)
Average precipitation mm (inches)	154.7 (6.09)	119.4 (4.70)	84.6 (3.33)	37.3 (1.47)	16.9 (0.67)	10.8 (0.43)	9.8 (0.39)	12.0 (0.47)	20.1 (0.79)	45.6 (1.80)	70.0 (2.76)	108 (4.3)	689.2 (27.2)
Average precipitation days	12.0	10.4	9.0	6.8	5.1	3.7	2.9	2.4	3.0	6.2	6.4	9.4	77.3
Average relative humidity (%)	73.2	75.5	74.8	76.0	74.7	73.3	69.5	65.6	63.0	67.0	68.5	70.9	71.0
Source: Servicio Nacional de Meteorología e Hidrología de Bolivia

== Economy ==
The main industries in the area revolve around agriculture and its derived products. The region is mainly dedicated to the production of grains such as corn and wheat, and fruits such as peaches, apples, grapes, pears, chirimoyas and plums. Among the value added products the most important are homemade bread, chamas, fruit liquor, wine, handmade rugs, and other handcrafts.

== Transport ==
Vallegrande can be accessed via a spur road branching off the (old, southern) Santa Cruz to Cochabamba highway and has an airstrip off Av Circunvalación 2do Anillo.

== Personalities ==
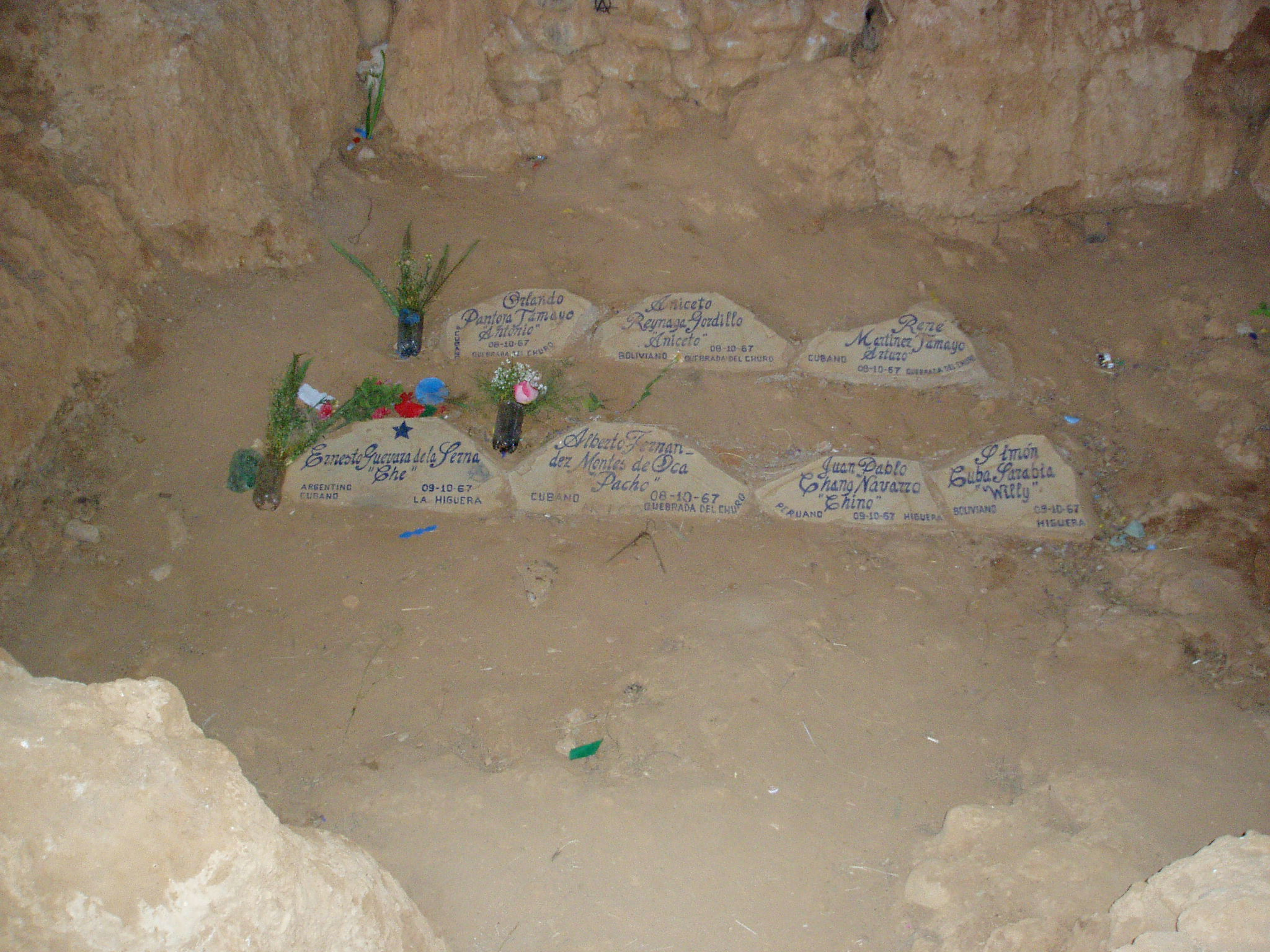
Site where Che Guevara was formerly buried

=== Che Guevara ===
On October 8, 1967, the Argentine Marxist revolutionary Che Guevara was captured by the CIA-assisted Bolivian Army nearby La Higuera, where he was killed the next day. The body was buried in Vallegrande, on an airstrip near Av. Circunvalación 2do Anillo, and was returned to Cuba in October 1997, where he was buried in a mausoleum in Santa Clara. A "Che Guevara Mausoleum" is located in Vallegrande on the former burial site and can be visited by tourists.

=== Edil Casiano Sandoval Morón. ===
Was a Bolivian politician in the decades of the 1960s and 2000s, he was named illustrious son of Vallegrande.

== See also ==
- War of the Republiquetas
