= 2023 Jujuy protests =

Anti-government protests in Argentina

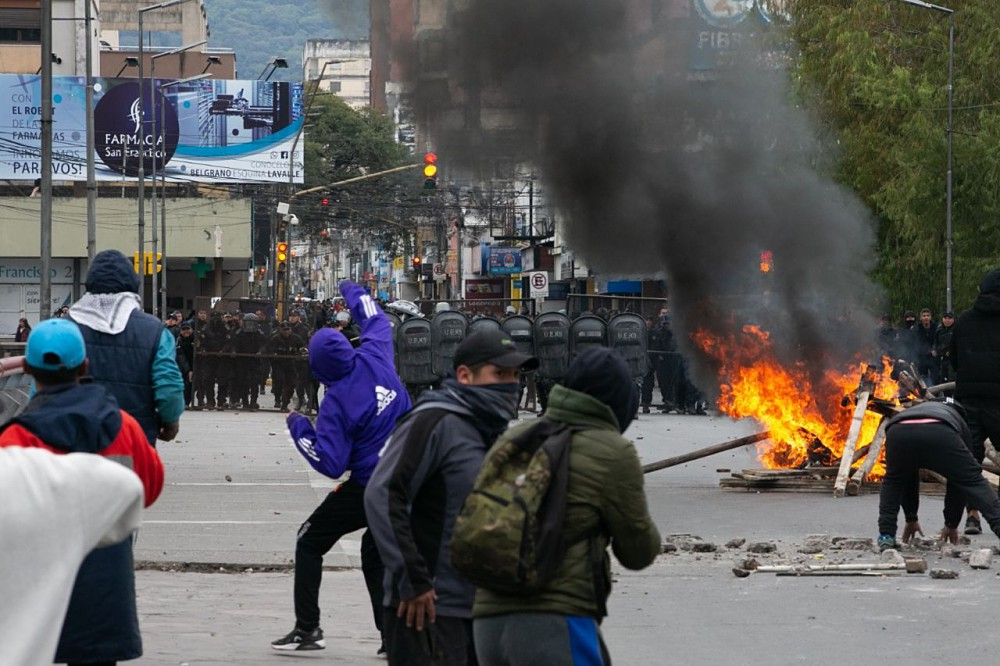
- Protests in Jujuy, Argentina
- Date: 16 June 2023 – 10 December 2023
- Location: San Salvador de Jujuy
- Caused by: Amendment to the Constitution of Jujuy
- Methods: Piqueterism, Political demonstration, Property damage
- Status: Roadblocks lifted, Constitutional amendment approved by the Supreme Court

Parties
Governor of Jujuy Province: Jujuy police	Protesters

Lead figures
Gerardo Morales; Guillermo Corro	Non-centralized leadership

A series of protests against the government of the Jujuy Province in Argentina started in June 2023, sparked by the amendment of the constitution of Jujuy. The demonstrators temporarily stormed into the Jujuy legislature and burned part of it.

== Context ==
The events took place a few months before the 2023 Argentine general election and a short time after the local elections in Jujuy. Governor Gerardo Morales, unable to run for a new term, was still popular and the election was won by his minister Carlos Sadir. The elections also voted in a constituent assembly to amend the constitution of Jujuy. Two articles proved controversial: one article forbids traffic obstruction, and the second regulates the rights of indigenous peoples. Eight elected legislators resigned from the assembly, two Peronists and six from left-wing parties. The remaining members, "Frente Cambia" and "Frente Justicialista", both voted for the changes. There were demonstrations by unions, indigenous groups, and political organizations.

== Protests ==
On 17 June, the intersection of roads 9 and 52 was blocked by piqueteros. The demonstrators erected walls of stones over the roads to strengthen the block, and intended to stay the whole night despite the cold climate. The police tried to disperse the demonstration at 19:00 with a vehicle to remove the rocks from the road. This led to a clash, with the police firing rubber bullets and the demonstrators throwing rocks. The clash ended with several injured on both sides and nearly 40 prisoners.

Morales liberated the detained people and canceled the amendment of two articles related to indigenous rights, trying to negotiate with the demonstrators. He said that the amendments actually increase their rights and that protesters are being lied to.

On 20 June, the day of the promulgation of the new constitution, the protests started at 11:30. The protesters took down the fences around the legislature and threw rocks at the police, who reacted with tear gas and rubber bullets. There was damage to nearby buildings, cars, and the legislature itself. Some protesters even managed to get inside the legislature and set parts of the building on fire. However, the ceremony was completed, and Morales and other politicians left afterwards. The protests ended with 70 demonstrators and 42 police injured and 58 people detained. Three cars were burned and eight buildings were vandalized. Roadblocks were set up along the province for several months. Amnesty International and the IACHR issued warnings against the excessive violence used by the police.

On 9 July, a tourist, Virginia Flores Gómez, died after being stranded in a bus in a roadblock on Route 9 near the town of Abra Pampa. The government initiated criminal proceedings against 23 protesters for manslaughter.

At the end of July a group of opponents of the reform marched from Jujuy to Buenos Aires to demonstrate in front of the National Congress, in the self-proclaimed "Third Malón de la Paz" (after similar initiatives in 1946 and 2006). They camped in Plaza Lavalle from 1 August to 16 December. The day after starting to break camp, they were evicted.

The roadblocks in Abra Pampa and La Quiaca were maintained until 17 October. On 22 December, after a change of government, the Supreme Court approved the constitutional reform.

== Reactions ==
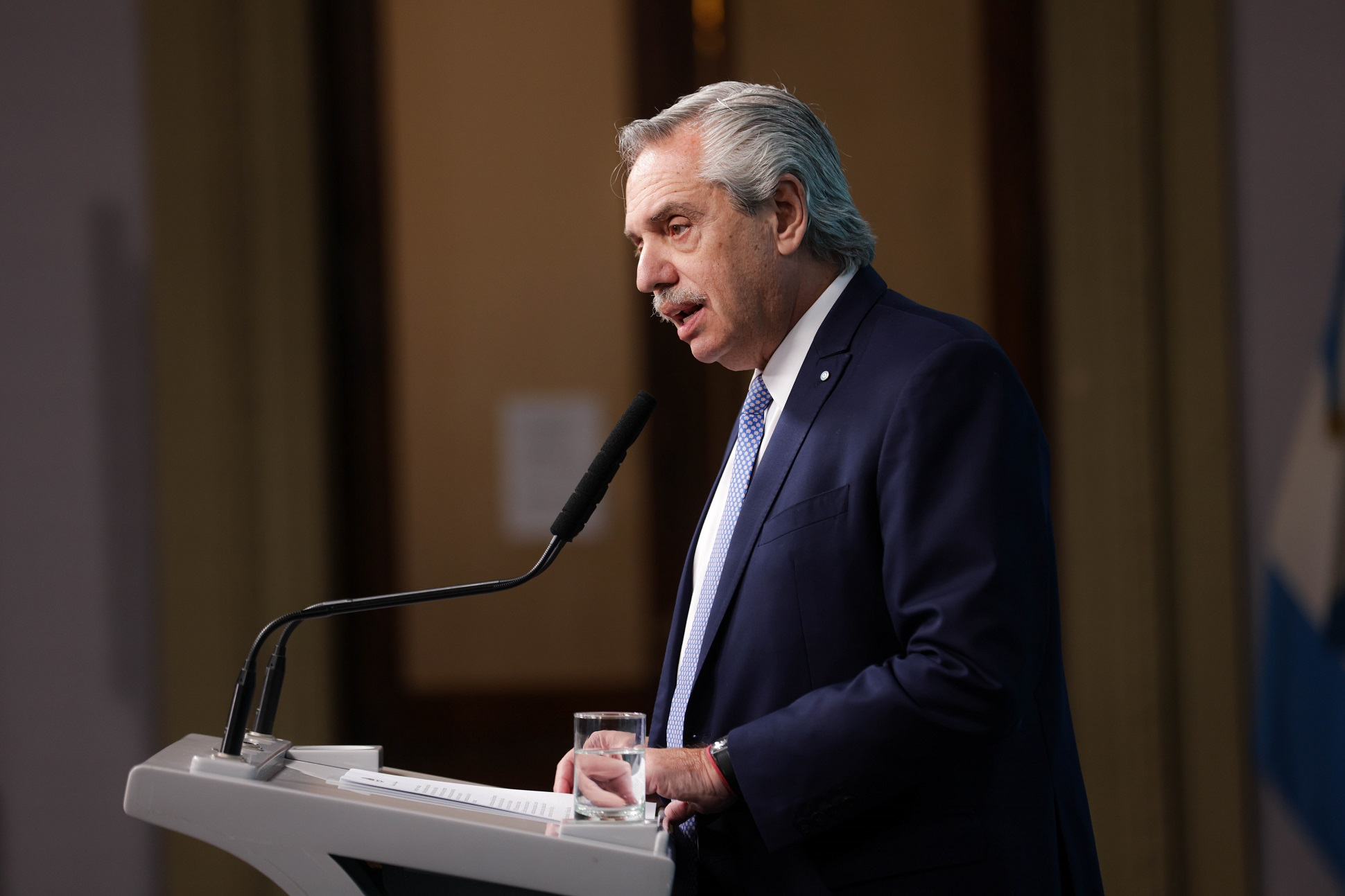
President Alberto Fernández makes a speech about the protests in Jujuy.

National minister Gabriel Katopodis wrote on Twitter that the national government deplores the repression against peaceful demonstrators. Morales mocked the term "peaceful" and detailed the criminal records of a number of detained demonstrators, as well as posting a video of them throwing rocks at the police. Their criminal record included theft, threats, and injuries to other people and others. As the protests got worse, Morales blamed president Alberto Fernández and vice president Cristina Fernández de Kirchner, who both replied that Morales was the one to blame. Presidential candidate Javier Milei opined instead that Morales had been too permissive and that the actions of the protests should have been halted long before they turned into vandalism.

Morales said that the protests were encouraged by the national government to distract from the scandal over the murder of Cecilia Strzyzowski in Chaco. He said that La Cámpora had brought two hundred protesters from other provinces and that the president had sided in the past with Milagro Sala. National minister of security Aníbal Fernández said that it was a lie and refused to send the national police to the conflict because the provincial police would already be dealing with it. This became part of a judiciary case against the detained protesters for assault, resistance to authority, injuring, aggravated damage, fire, and the attack to the legislature. Some of those protesters were from Buenos Aires, and the investigation of their cell phones confirmed that they were paid $5,000 to take part in the protest and that they were instructed to use hoods and surgical masks to conceal their identities. A pair of protesters carried Arg$1,000,000 in banknotes, stored in a backpack, and some of them were identified as members of HIJOS and work unions.

Kirchnerite diplomats negotiated a swift reaction of the Inter-American Commission on Human Rights (IACHR), who described abuses and urged to respect the freedom of speech, the standards in the use of the force, and political dialogue that respects union rights and indigenous groups. The statement was criticized by diplomats from Juntos por el Cambio who said that it was based on biased and unchecked sources and that the IACHR has not been present in Jujuy during the events. Diplomat Brian Schapira pointed out that the text cites sources such as the "Consejo Federal de Mecanismos Locales para la Prevención de la Tortura", the "Defensoría de los Derechos de las Niñas, Niños y Adolescentes" and a news article from Telam. According to Schapira, all those organizations and news agencies are blatantly not neutral and biased towards the government.

National deputy Gisela Marziotta, from the Frente de Todos proposed a bill to declare the federal intervention of Jujuy, which would remove the authorities from the three local powers and replace them with people sent by the national government to restore order. This was immediately rejected by politicians from Juntos por el Cambio. The president gave a conference and announced that he had instructed Martín Soria, minister of justice, to denounce the amendment to the constitution of Jujuy as unconstitutional.
