= Julio Ferreyra =

Argentine politician (1942–2023)

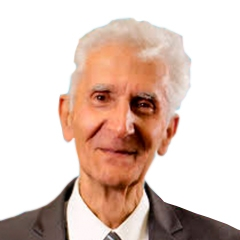
- Ferreyra in 2019

National Deputy
- In office 10 December 2019 – 5 August 2023
- Constituency: Jujuy

Personal details
- Born: 1 July 1942 San José de Metán, Salta, Argentina
- Died: 5 August 2023 (aged 81)
- Party: Justicialist Party
- Other political affiliations: Front for Victory (2003–2017); Frente de Todos (2019–2023)

Julio Daniel Ferreyra (1 July 1942 – 5 August 2023) was an Argentine politician who served as National Deputy representing Jujuy Province. A member of the Justicialist Party, Ferreyra was Director of the Jujuy Civil Registry for twenty years, from 1999, until being elected to Congress in 2019. He sat in the Frente de Todos parliamentary bloc.

At the time of his death, he was the oldest serving member of the Chamber of Deputies.

== Early and personal life ==
Ferreyra was born on 1 July 1942 in San José de Metán, Salta Province. He was married and has three children, including one daughter.

== Political career ==
Ferreyra was elected to the City Council of Palpalá, Jujuy Province, in 1983. He ran for the Movimiento Popular Jujeño (MPJ), a regionalist party. Later, in 1999, he was appointed Director of the Jujuy Civil Registry by Governor Eduardo Fellner. He would serve in the position for the following twenty years, being renewed by the administrations of Walter Barrionuevo and Gerardo Morales.

Ferreyra was the Justicialist Party's nominee to compete in the 2019 gubernatorial election in Jujuy; he faced off the Radical Civic Union–Cambiemos's candidate, incumbent governor Morales. Ferreyra did not count with the full support of the Justicialist Party, however, as a splinter faction supported the candidacy of Senator Guillermo Snopek. Ferreyra received 32.97% of the popular vote, losing against Morales' 43.76%.

=== National Deputy ===
Ahead of the 2019 legislative election, Ferreyra was nominated, alongside Carolina Moisés, to run for Jujuy's seats in the Argentine Chamber of Deputies, as part of the Frente de Todos list. Ferreyra was the second candidate in the list, behind Moisés. The Frente de Todos list was the most voted in the province, with 45.40% of the votes, and both Moisés and Ferreyra were elected.

As national deputy, Ferreyra formed part of the parliamentary commissions on Pensions and Social Security, Maritime Interests, Cooperative Affairs and NGOs, Analysis of Tax Norms, Social Action and Public Health, and Transport. Ferreyra caused controversy in 2020 when, during the debate on the Voluntary Interruption of Pregnancy bill (which legalized abortion in Argentina), he claimed he and his daughter were receiving threats for his intention to vote in favour of the bill. In the end, he abstained from the vote, becoming the only abstention in the vote.

== Death ==
Ferreyra died on 5 August 2023, at the age of 81.
