= Guillermo Snopek =

Argentine politician (born 1975)

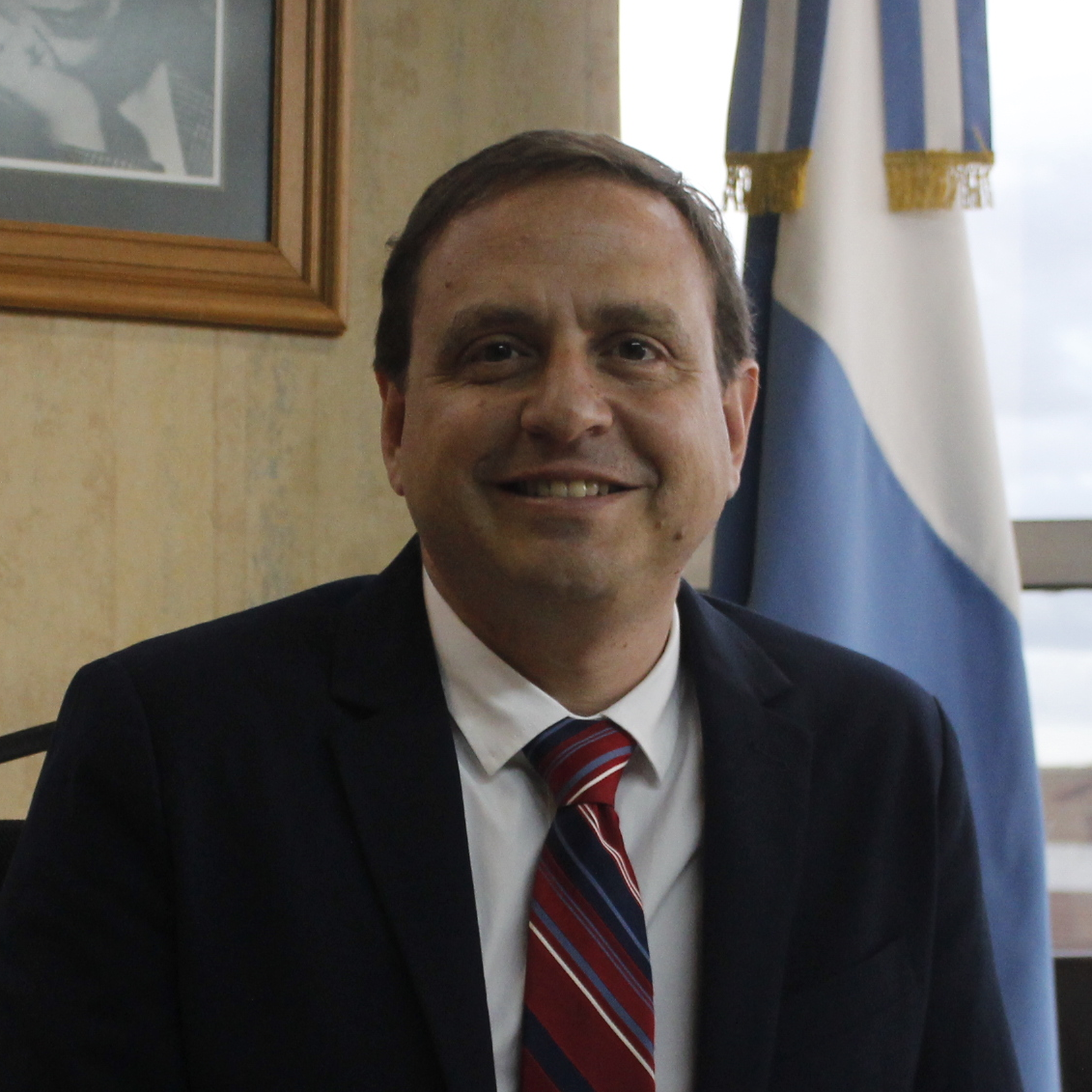

National Deputy
- Incumbent
- Assumed office 10 December 2023
- Constituency: Jujuy
- In office 10 December 2015 – 10 December 2017
- Constituency: Jujuy

National Senator
- In office 10 December 2017 – 10 December 2023
- Constituency: Jujuy

Provincial Deputy of Jujuy
- In office 10 December 2009 – 10 December 2015

Personal details
- Born: 11 January 1975 (age 51) San Salvador de Jujuy, Argentina
- Party: Justicialist Party
- Other political affiliations: Front for Victory (2009–2017); Unidad Ciudadana (2017–2019); Frente de Todos (since 2019)
- Education: National University of Tucumán

Guillermo Eugenio Mario Snopek (born 11 January 1975) is an Argentine politician of the Justicialist Party. He has served as a National Senator for Jujuy Province from 2017 to 2023, having served in lower chamber of Congress from 2015 to 2017 and in the Legislature of Jujuy from 2009 to 2015.

In 2023, he was once again elected to the Chamber of Deputies as a deputy for Jujuy.

== Early life ==
Snopek was born on 11 January 1975 in San Salvador de Jujuy into a prominent political family. His father, Guillermo Eugenio Snopek (1947–1996), served as governor of Jujuy, while his grandfather, Guillermo Snopek (1916–2007) served as vice governor of the province and as a national senator during the 1960s.

Snopek studied law at the National University of Tucumán, graduating in 2001.

== Political career ==
A member of the Justicialist Party, Snopek was first elected to the Legislature of Jujuy in 2009. He was re-elected in 2013. In 2015, Snopek ran for a seat in the National Chamber of Deputies as the first candidate in the Front for Victory list, followed by Carolina Moisés. The list received 37.75% of the vote, enough only for Snopek to be elected.

Two years later, in the 2017 legislative election, Snopek ran for National Senator for Jujuy, as the first candidate in the Justicialist Front list. With 20.79% of the vote, Snopek's list came second in the general election, and he was elected as the minority seat. His vacancy in the Chamber of Deputies was filled by Moisés.

During his term as senator, Snopek presided the parliamentary commission on constitutional affairs, and formed part of the commissions on justice and criminal affairs, general legislation, rights and guarantees, mining and energy, infrastructure and housing, systems and mass media, environment and sustainable development, magistrate trials, and the permanent bicameral commission on legislative procedure. In 2018 and later in 2020, he voted against the Voluntary Interruption of Pregnancy Bill, which legalised abortion in Argentina.
