= Horacio Guzmán =

Argentine lawyer and politician

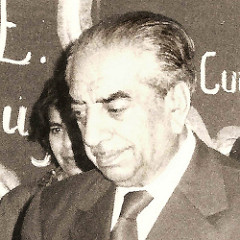

Governor of Jujuy
- In office May 1, 1958 – April 24, 1962; October 12, 1963 – August 21, 1964; January 9, 1982 - October 25, 1982

Personal details
- Born: February 16, 1913 San Salvador de Jujuy
- Died: August 11, 1992 (aged 79)
- Party: Radical Civic Union
- Spouse: Elvira Romero

Horacio Guzmán (February 16, 1913 – August 11, 1992) was an Argentine lawyer and politician who served as Governor of Jujuy Province from 1958 to 1962, and from 1963 to 1964.

== Life and times ==
Horacio Gregorio Guzmán was born in the city of San Salvador de Jujuy to Margarita Ocampo and Stanislaus Flavio Guzmán, in 1913. He enrolled at the National University of Córdoba, and earned a juris doctor in 1939. He joined the centrist Radical Civic Union (UCR), which at the time struggled under the system of "patriotic fraud" that kept the conservative Concordance government in power, as a member of their youth chapter, and in 1940, was elected to the Provincial Legislature.

Following the 1955 overthrow of populist President Juan Perón, Guzmán was named Director of the Provincial Social Security Fund, and he became head of the Jujuy UCR. The schism in the UCR following its 1956 convention led Guzmán to join the more progressive, UCRI, however, which defeated the rival UCRP in the February 1958 general election. Guzmán ran for and won the governor's post in Jujuy by a wide margin, and he promptly adopted the developmentalist policies advanced by the UCRI standard-bearer, President-elect Arturo Frondizi.

His administration initiated a number of significant public works in Jujuy, long among Argentina's least-developed provinces. Some of the most important include the El Cadillal International Airport, a comprehensive housing plan, numerous clinics, the Children's and Neuropsychiatric Hospitals, provincial roads network, the International Bridge between La Quiaca and Villazón (Bolivia), new courts and provincial legislature buildings, the La Quiaca Normal School, pensions for teachers, and the province's first school of higher learning, the Institute of Economic Sciences (which became the National University of Jujuy in 1973).

Guzmán also created incentives for the establishment of private industries, and a number of paper mills opened in the province, including one converting sugar cane fibers into pulp; this, in turn, prompted the Ledesma sugar mills (among the most important in Argentina) to modernize their facilities. His policies, as well as his support for the refurbishment of numerous decaying churches in the mountainous province, earned him the appointment in 1960 as Knight Commander of the Order of St. Gregory the Great by Pope John XXIII. Later that year, he also received the Bolivian Order of the Condor of the Andes for his efforts to improve ties with Argentina's northern neighbor.

National politics prevailed, however, when the March 29, 1962, overthrow of President Frondizi led to Guzmán's own removal. He was returned to office by voters in the July 1963 elections; but his second tenure was fraught with political disputes. The legislature, to which a Workers' Party majority was elected with Peronist support, refused to certify Guzmán's victory, and the subsequent gridlock ultimately led President Arturo Illia's August 1964 order that Governor Guzmán be removed. Guzmán subsequently founded the Jujuy Popular Movement (MPJ), though he would not return to office until January 1982, when the dictatorship of General Leopoldo Galtieri appointed him governor.

He resigned that October, and was elected to the Argentine Chamber of Deputies in 1985. Guzmán was given a United Nations Medal for Political Merit in April 1986. He again resigned, in 1987, and ran for the office of Mayor of San Salvador de Jujuy, a post he won.

Dr. Horacio Guzmán died on August 11, 1992. His daughter, Dr. Cristina Guzmán, served in Congress for the MPJ from 1983 to 1999, and a granddaughter, Monica Arancio, was elected the first female Senator from Jujuy, in 2001.
