= Carolina Moisés =

Argentine politician (born 1975)

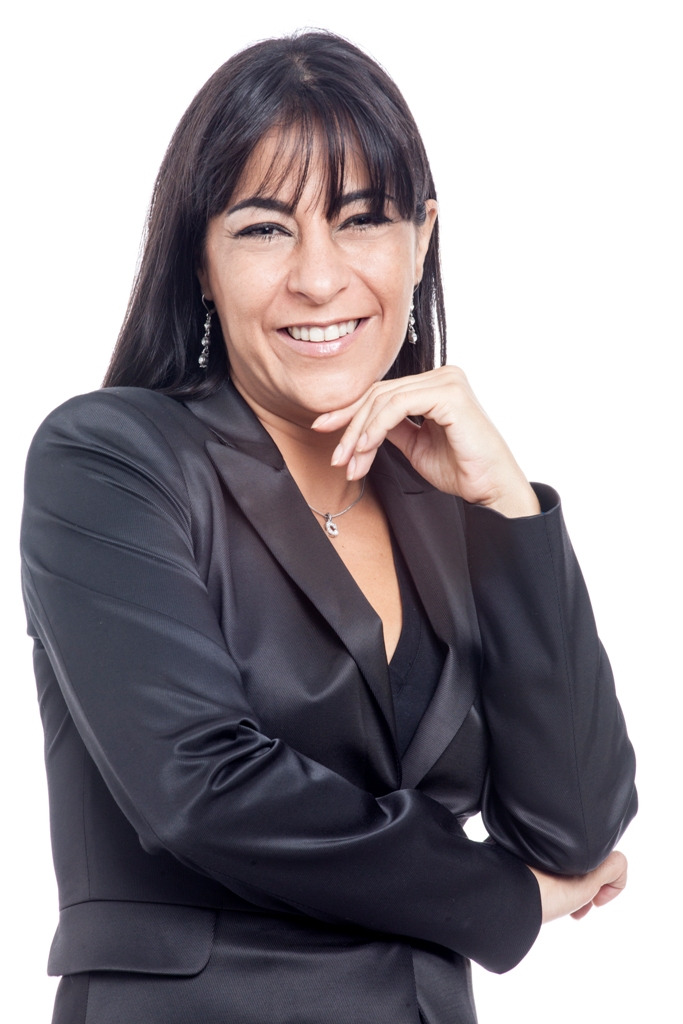

National Senator
- Incumbent
- Assumed office 10 December 2023
- Constituency: Jujuy

National Deputy
- In office 18 December 2017 – 10 December 2023
- Constituency: Jujuy
- In office 10 December 2005 – 10 December 2009
- Constituency: Jujuy

Provincial Legislator of Jujuy
- In office 10 December 2009 – 10 December 2013
- In office 10 December 1997 – 10 December 2005

Personal details
- Born: 5 March 1975 (age 51) San Pedro de Jujuy, Argentina
- Party: Justicialist Party (until 2013); Arriba Jujuy (since 2013)
- Other political affiliations: FREJUPO (1997); Front for Victory (2003–2017); Unidad Ciudadana (2017–2019); Frente de Todos (2019–present)
- Education: Universidad de Belgrano

María Carolina Moisés (born 5 March 1975) is an Argentine politician, currently serving as a National Senator for Jujuy Province. Originally a member of the Justicialist Party, Moisés has co-led the local Arriba Jujuy party since 2013. She previously served as a National Deputy on two occasions, from 2019 to 2023, and from 2005 to 2009. She has also served as a member of the provincial legislature of Jujuy and as a councilwoman in her hometown of San Pedro de Jujuy.

== Early and personal life ==
Moisés was born on 5 March 1975 in San Pedro de Jujuy. Her father is Julio Moisés, a Justicialist Party politician who has served as mayor of San Pedro on a number of occasions. Moisés studied Political Science at the Universidad de Belgrano, graduating in 1997. She has one child.

== Political career ==
As part of the Justicialist Party and the People's Justicialist Front (FREJUPO), Moisés was elected to the Legislature of Jujuy in 1997. She was re-elected in 2001. In 2005, she was elected to the Argentine Chamber of Deputies on the Front for Victory list, as the second candidate, behind Carlos Daniel Snopek. The list was the most voted in the province with 48.09% of the vote, and both Snopek and Moisés were elected. She served her four-year term until 2009.

Moisés was re-elected to the Chamber of Deputies of Jujuy in the 2009 provincial elections, serving until 2013. In 2013, Moisés and her father, Julio Moisés, co-founded the Arriba Jujuy party, remaining within the Front for Victory. Upon the end of her term as provincial deputy, she was appointed Secretary of State for International Relations and Regional Immigration of Jujuy Province, in the governorship of Eduardo Fellner. In 2016, she was elected to the City Council of San Pedro de Jujuy.

=== National Deputy (2017–present) ===
Moisés ran for a seat in the lower chamber of Congress again in the 2015 general election, as the second candidate in the Front for Victory list, behind Guillermo Snopek. The list received 37.75% of the vote, not enough for Moisés to be elected. In 2017, Snopek was elected National Senator for Jujuy, and Moisés filled in Snopek's vacancy in the lower chamber. She took office on 18 December 2017.

Ahead of the 2019 legislative election, Moisés was nominated, alongside Julio Ferreyra, to renew her term in the Chamber of Deputies as part of the Frente de Todos list. Moisés was the first candidate in the list. The Frente de Todos list was the most voted in the province, with 45.40% of the votes, and both Moisés and Ferreyra were elected.

During her 2019–2023 term, Moisés formed part of the parliamentary commissions on Culture, Foreign Affairs, Communications, Mercosur, Freedom of Expression, and General Legislation. She was a supporter of the legalization of abortion in Argentina, voting in favour of the two Voluntary Interruption of Pregnancy bills that were debated by the Argentine Congress in 2018 and 2020.
