= Carlos Sadir =

Argentine politician

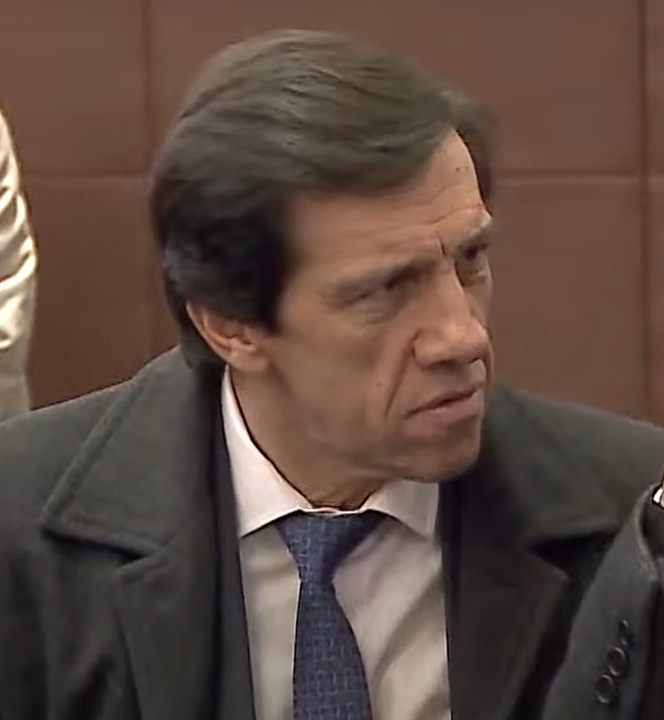

Governor of Jujuy
- Incumbent
- Assumed office 10 December 2023
- Vice Governor: Alberto Bernis
- Preceded by: Gerardo Morales

Minister of the Treasury of Jujuy Province
- In office 31 May 2016 – 10 December 2023
- Governor: Gerardo Morales
- Preceded by: Carlos Alfonso
- Succeeded by: Eduardo Federico Cardozo

Personal details
- Born: 24 September 1958 (age 68) San Salvador de Jujuy, Argentina
- Party: Radical Civic Union
- Other political affiliations: Juntos por el Cambio (2019–2023)
- Education: National University of Jujuy

Carlos Alberto Sadir (born 24 September 1958) is an Argentine public accountant and politician. He is currently governor of Jujuy Province, since 10 December 2023. He belongs to the Radical Civic Union (UCR).

Sadir previously served as Minister of the Treasury and Finances of Jujuy, under Governor Gerardo Morales.

== Early life ==
Sadir was born on 24 September 1958, in San Salvador de Jujuy, into a family of businesspeople; his parents (of Syrian-Lebanese descent) sold gaucho attire and owned a restaurant in El Carmen, where Sadir worked as a youth. He graduated as a public accountant from the National University of Jujuy in 1983.

He became politically active at his university, joining Franja Morada, the student wing of the Radical Civic Union (UCR). At Franja Morada, he met the man who would later become his political mentor, Gerardo Morales.

== Political career ==
Sadir's political career began as an auditor at the Tribunal of Accounts of Jujuy Province, later becoming an auditor chief of division. He later held minor positions in the treasury of the municipal government of San Salvador de Jujuy, then under the mayorship of Hugo Cid Conde. He also held positions under Mayor Raúl "Chuli" Jorge.

Sadir was elected to the San Salvador City Council in 2011, and re-elected in 2015. He presided the City Council until May 2016, when he resigned to become Minister of the Treasury of the province under now-governor Morales.

As minister, Sadir orchestrated the arrival of China-based funds for the Cauchari Solar Park. He also had clashes with school teachers and other public sector workers on the matter of wage negotiations, eventually leading to the 2023 protests.

He was touted by Morales as the leading coalition's gubernatorial candidate in the 2023 provincial elections, with provincial legislator Alberto Bernis as candidate to vice-governor. On 7 May 2023, the Sadir–Bernis ticket won with nearly 50% of the vote, comfortably surpassing Justicialist Party candidate Rubén Rivarola and Workers' Left Front candidate Alejandro Vilca.

On January 4, 2024, two men (Nahuel Morandini and Humberto Villegas) were arrested following a complaint from Tulia Snopek, Morales' spouse, for making jokes on social networks about her alleged infidelity. They were held for "psychological injuries" and "alteration of the identity of a minor", referring to Snopek's daughter. Both men remained in preventive custody as of February 24, which brought about criticism from Law specialists; Sadir denied being involved, despite the fact that governmental offices are taking part in the trial.

== Electoral history ==
=== Executive ===
Electoral history of Carlos Sadir
| Election | Office | List | Votes | | | Result | Ref. |
| Election | Office | List | Total | % | P. | Result | Ref. |
|---|---|---|---|---|---|---|---|
| 2023 | Governor of Jujuy | Jujuy Changes | 196,714 | 49.59% | 1st | Elected | |

Political offices
| Preceded by Gerardo Morales | Governor of Jujuy; 2023–present | Incumbent |
