= Carlos Ferraro =

Argentine politician (1953–2025)

Carlos Alfonso "Chato" Ferraro (Spanish: [ˈkaɾlos alˈfonso ˈtʃato feˈraɾo]; May 21, 1953 – August 11, 2025) was an Argentine journalist, writer and politician.

== Life and career ==
Ferraro was born in San Salvador de Jujuy on May 21, 1953. He graduated with a degree in Information Sciences from the National University of La Plata. He edited several books of short stories and poems, including Azuledades (1979), and Don Cucha (1983).

He was press chief at the National University of Jujuy, editor-in-chief of the newspaper Pautas, and was a television host of political journalism. He also directed a television program to disseminate tourism in his province.

In the October 1995 elections, he accompanied national senator Guillermo Eugenio Snopek as a candidate for vice-governor of the province of Jujuy, obtaining victory and taking office on December 10 of that year. In February of the following year, however, Snopek died in a car accident, forcing Ferraro to take over the provincial government on February 24.

His government was convulsed by the union struggle that neoliberal policy faced. The division of the ruling party, the Justicialist Party, prevented him from holding a clearly unstable position; so he submitted his resignation on November 26, 1998. He was succeeded by provincial deputy Eduardo Fellner.

After going through a serious illness, he died on August 11, 2025, at the age of 72.
