= Second Malón de la Paz =

Protest held by natives of Argentina in 2006

The Second Malón de la Paz was a protest march of Aboriginals of northwestern Argentina, demanding the restitution of their ancient lands. It started on 7 August 2006 in the province of Jujuy.

Malón is a word derived from Mapudungun and refers to a surprise incursion, as practised by the Native tribes attacking creole settlements in the past. Therefore, the expression means "Peace Incursion". The first Malón de la Paz was a 2,000 km march from Jujuy to Buenos Aires in 1946, to present land and human rights claims to President Juan Perón.

The Second Malón de la Paz was triggered by the long delay and refusal of the provincial government of Jujuy to comply with a judicial order granting the Indigenous communities 15,000 km^{2} of land. An assembly of members of different communities gathered in Abra Pampa, 200 km north of San Salvador de Jujuy (the same place where, 60 years before, the first Malón started). Following the resolutions of the assembly, a number of delegates from the communities scattered around the province marched from the Quebrada de Humahuaca to Purmamarca (60 km north of the provincial capital).

After a new assembly, on 8 August around 1,000 people blockaded National Routes 16 and 9, and demanded to be heard by governor Eduardo Fellner. The blockade is slated to last indefinitely.

== History ==
The first Malón de Paz was not well received by the national government. Although the marchers got the attention and support of the people in the way, as well as formal acknowledgment by President Perón, they were soon expelled from Buenos Aires empty-handed. Only three years later, in 1949, the national government expropriated some lands to be granted to the Indigenous communities, but the cession was never performed.

The 1994 reform of the Argentine Constitution recognized the rights of the "originary peoples" to own their ancient lands. According to the delegates of the communities, in 1996 the national government started sending funds to Jujuy to handle the surveys and paperwork needed to make the lands property of the originary communities, but only 7 out of 123 collective property titles have been granted to them.

On 2 May 2003, justice ordered that the papers had to be delivered within no more than 15 months. The provincial government appealed the decision. The originary communities were displeased by this, and sent a letter to President Néstor Kirchner. The drastic measure of blocking national roads was called by the press "an ultimatum" to the provincial authorities.

== See also ==
- Demographics of Argentina
- History of Argentina
- Indigenous peoples of the Americas
