= Ciudad Perico =

- Town
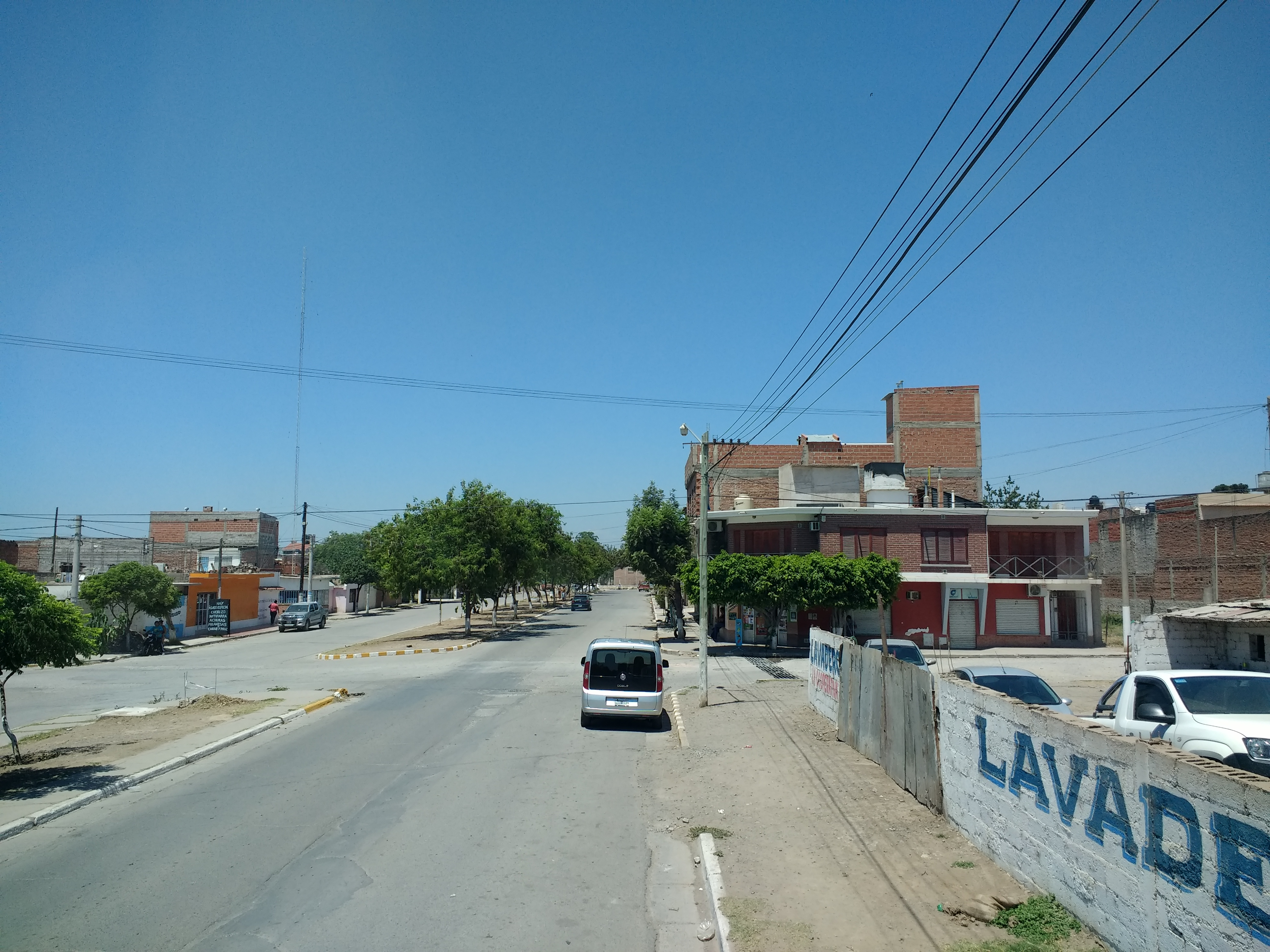

- Location in Argentina
- Coordinates: 24°23′S 65°07′W
- Country: Argentina
- Province: Jujuy
- Department: El Carmen
- Founded: October 29, 1913

Government
  - Mayor: Rolando Pascual Ficoseco
- Elevation: 895 m (2,936 ft)

Population (2012)
  - Total: 49,422
- Time zone: UTC−3 (ART)
- Postal code: Y4608
- Area code: 0388
- Website: perico.gov.ar

Ciudad Perico, or simply Perico, is a town and municipality in Jujuy Province in Argentina.

== Overview ==
The town was founded with the 1913 opening of the namesake station on the Central Northern Railway. Known initially as Estación Perico, the town was among those renamed for Juan Domingo Perón during the populist leader's 1946 — 55 administration.

Governor Horacio Guzmán chose Perico as the site of the future El Cadillal International Airport in 1961, and the facility was inaugurated in 1967 (it was renamed in Guzmán's honor in 1992).

Long a center for the production and distribution of tobacco, Perico's growers organized the Cooperativa de Tabacaleros de Jujuy in 1969, and an important Massalin Particulares cigarette plant opened shortly afterwards.

The town's strategic location between the provincial capital, San Salvador de Jujuy, and the city of Salta made the rail station among the busiest in the region. The privatization of the Ferrocarril General Manuel Belgrano after 1992 led to the station's closure, however.

The National Agricultural Technology Institute maintains a facility in Perico. A Zona Franca (Free economic zone) was established in Perico, and the town's Nobleza Piccardo plant became the nation's largest producer and exporter of Blue Virginia tobacco products.
