= Malón de la Paz =

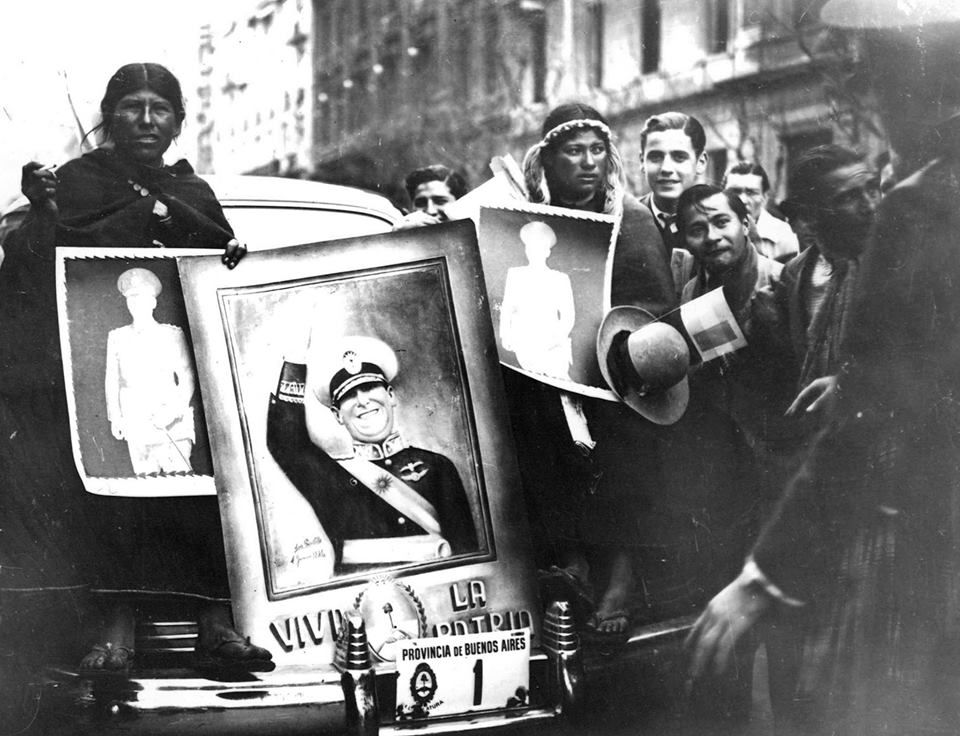
The Malón de la Paz entering Buenos Aires, 3 August 1946.

The Malón de la Paz was a march of Indigenous peoples of northwestern Argentina to the capital, Buenos Aires, demanding the restitution of their ancient lands, in 1946. The participants marched about 2,000 km to present their claims to President Juan Perón.

== Origin of the name ==
Malón is an Argentine and Chilean Spanish word derived from Mapudungun malok, "invade". It refers to a surprise incursion, as often conducted by aboriginals when attacking criollo (Spanish) settlements. The expression Malón de la Paz therefore means "Peace Incursion"; it is a kind of oxymoron. It was coined by one of the initial organizers of the march, the retired military engineer Mario Augusto Bertonasco.

== Background ==
The lands originally inhabited by indigenous peoples in Argentina were almost completely occupied by the initial European settlers and by their descendants. In some regions the aboriginals were assimilated as cheap workforce for creole landowners; in others they were displaced and then exterminated (see Conquest of the Desert).

Near the end of his term, President Hipólito Yrigoyen planned to expropriate lands and grant them to their former aboriginal inhabitants, but a coup in 1930 ousted him and killed the project.

On 31 August 1945, Kolla communities in the northwestern Argentine provinces of Jujuy and Salta, through a group of representatives, sent a note to the National Agrarian Council demanding the restitution of their lands, in compliance with previous laws. On 17 January 1946 President Edelmiro Julián Farrell signed the expropriation decree. But as funds for the necessary land surveys and paperwork were in progress, the direction of the Council passed to other people, who blocked them.

== Beginning of the march ==
The main organizer of the march was retired Lieutenant Engineer Mario Augusto Bertonasco, who had worked with the Mapuche in land claims and then moved to Jujuy and to Orán, Salta. It was he who coined the expression Malón de la Paz.

The march started on 15 May 1946 in Abra Pampa, Jujuy, and arrived at the provincial capital San Salvador de Jujuy on 24 May, where the Puneños (on foot) were joined by another column coming from Orán and Iruya, Salta (on mules). They were 174 in total. Two days later the marchers departed for Salta and then passed by Tucumán on 9 June. They arrived at Córdoba on 22 June, and marched on to Rosario.

On 10 July the aboriginal leaders Valentín Zárate and José Nievas, who had come ahead of the march while the rest were in Rosario, were received in Buenos Aires by president of the Chamber of Deputies at the National Congress.

The march went on, passing by San Nicolás de los Arroyos on 18 July and by Pergamino, Buenos Aires on 21 July, where a Neighbors Commission greeted the marchers with offers of food and clothing. They were received by 60,000 people, including municipal authorities and farmers (who were additionally claiming for an agrarian reform).

The Malón reached Luján on 30 July, and Merlo on 1 August, where it was met and received support by hundreds of residents.

== Entrance in Buenos Aires ==
The march entered Buenos Aires through Liniers on 3 August 1946. They were received by the head of the Aboriginal Protection department, and given accommodation (whether significantly or not) at the Immigrants' Hotel.

The marchers, joined by local residents, went up to Congress, where they were homaged, and then to Plaza de Mayo. Former President Farrell, President Perón and other authorities greeted them from the balcony of the Casa Rosada. Nationalist groups opposed to the aboriginals caused minor incidents, but were repelled by the people. Perón then paid a personal visit to the marchers.

== Forced return ==
After this reception, however, the government showed its true colours. On 27 August, forces of the Naval Prefecture were sent to force the marchers to get on a train. On encountering resistance, the Federal Police was called, and around midnight the Immigrants' Hotel was attacked with tear gas. Lieutenant Bertonasco refused to give the order of abandoning the hotel, and left. Once in the train, the marchers broke the windows and some of their leaders jumped off. The Kolla deputy for Jujuy, Dionisio Viviano, met with them and Bertonasco to intercede for the marchers, but were not heard.

The train passed by Rosario and Córdoba en route back to the northwest, with the stations surrounded by police forces to keep the passengers from coming out. On 3 September the train reached San Salvador de Jujuy.

On 30 November, President Perón declared that the Malón de la Paz "did not represent... the authentic indigenous inhabitants of our north", and claimed that they had come by train and motor vehicles rather than on foot. Moreover, he said, some were not even from the north of Argentina, but had been born in the north of the province of Buenos Aires and were unwilling to return.

== Legacy ==
Despite the reaction to the Malón, in 1949 the national government expropriated some lands in the Puna and the Quebrada de Humahuaca, for them to be returned to their original inhabitants, but this was never done.

On 7 August 2006, sixty years after the first Malón, a march with similar goals (the Second Malón de la Paz) was organized in Jujuy, to demand that the provincial government comply with a judicial order to grant the indigenous communities about 15,000 km^{2} of land.

The Third Malón de la Paz took place within the context of the 2023 Jujuy protests.

== See also ==
- Demographics of Argentina
- History of Argentina
- Indigenous peoples of the Americas
