= Gerardo Morales (politician) =

Argentine politician

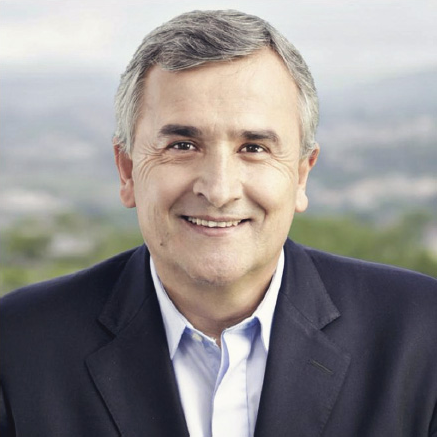

President of the National Committee of the Radical Civic Union
- In office 17 December 2021 – 15 December 2023
- Preceded by: Alfredo Cornejo
- Succeeded by: Martín Lousteau
- In office 1 December 2006 – 5 December 2009
- Preceded by: Roberto Iglesias
- Succeeded by: Ernesto Sanz

Governor of Jujuy
- In office 10 December 2015 – 10 December 2023
- Vice Governor: Carlos Haquim
- Preceded by: Eduardo Fellner
- Succeeded by: Carlos Sadir

National Senator
- In office December 2001 – 10 December 2015
- Constituency: Jujuy

Secretary of Social Development
- In office 20 June 2000 – 5 September 2001
- President: Fernando de la Rúa
- Preceded by: Cecilia Felgueras
- Succeeded by: Daniel Sartor

Personal details
- Born: 18 July 1959 (age 66) San Salvador de Jujuy, Argentina
- Party: Radical Civic Union
- Other political affiliations: Juntos por el Cambio (2015–present)
- Profession: Public accountant

Gerardo Rubén Morales (born 18 July 1959) is an Argentine politician, former Governor of Jujuy Province (2015–2023) and Secretary General of the Radical Civic Union.

He was a member of the Argentine Senate representing Jujuy Province, elected for the Front of Jujuy. He was a candidate for Vice President of Argentina on Roberto Lavagna's UNA ticket in the 2007 elections. From 2015 to 2023, he was Governor of Jujuy, the first non-Peronist elected to the post since the restoration of democracy.

== Early life and career ==
Morales was born in Salta Province. He worked on the Ferrocarril General Manuel Belgrano railway as a waiter at age 18, and was promoted to the post of administrator. He enrolled at the National University of Jujuy, where he earned a degree in Accountancy. Morales was later appointed Director of Liquidations at the Provincial Insurance Institute. He also lectured and was politically active at university, teaching in Political Economy courses from 1985 to 1993. He married in 1985, and had three children; he admitted to past infidelities in a 2008 interview.

== Political career ==
In 1989 Morales was elected as a provincial deputy and in 1993 became leader of the UCR block in the legislature. He served as president of the Finance Committee in 1991 and 1992. He was nominated for Vice Governor of Jujuy in a defeated 1991 UCR ticket, and with the support of party leader Raúl Alfonsín, ran for Governor of Jujuy in 1995 and 1999, albeit unsuccessfully. He stepped down as a Jujuy Congressman in 2000 to join the national government of President Fernando de la Rúa as Secretary for Social Development. Morales was elected to the Argentine Senate in 2001 mid-term elections.

After the election of Néstor Kirchner as President of Argentina in 2003, many leading Radicals publicly supported Kirchner's populist left-wing agenda. The group, known as Radicales K, included provincial governors and national legislators. The national president of the Radicals, Roberto Iglesias took a hard-line approach against Kirchner, however, opposing efforts to re-align UCR elected officials toward the popular Kirchner. Morales, who supported Iglesias' policy, was re-elected to the Senate in 2005.

Iglesias led negotiations to find a suitable candidate for the UCR to back in the 2007 Presidential elections against Kirchner's wife and FpV nominee, Cristina Fernández de Kirchner. Roberto Lavagna, a former minister under Kirchner who subsequently opposed his policies, appeared to be the favored candidate for the majority of the party. Iglesias resigned the presidency of the party in November 2006, however, due to differences with Lavagna, having reached the conclusion that an alliance with him would be a mistake, and joined those who maintained that the party should look for its own candidate (the so-called Radicales R).

The UCR National Committee appointed Morales as its new president in December 2006. Morales supported the party's Rosario convention, in which Alfonsín's call for an alliance with Lavagna was adopted into the party platform. He became Lavagna's running mate in the presidential election of October 2007, on a centrist electoral front known as "An Advanced Nation" ('UNA'), and placed third.

Morales entered subsequently into a heated political dispute with Milagro Sala, the leader of the Indigenist Tupac Amaru Neighborhood Association and with whom he is obsessed. Giving rise to unjust persecution and illegitimate imprisonment that continues to this day. He was attacked in 2009, though without injury, by two youths tied to the association, and filed charges against their leader. Sala, who denied involvement, alleged that the accusations were politically and racially motivated. She responded with demands that Morales' estate be investigated, and each exchanged accusations of corruption.

Morales was elected leader of the UCR Caucus in the Senate in December 2009; he succeeded Ernesto Sanz, who replaced Morales as President of the party's National Committee.

=== Governor of Jujuy ===
Morales was elected governor in 2015. Expecting protests from Milagro Sala, he requested policial reinforcements to the national government, to prevent riots during the end of the year. 43 gendarmeries were sent to Jujuy, but died in a car accident at Rosario de la Frontera, in unclear circumstances. The Tupac Amaru organization denied the existence of violence in the province, and started a permanent demonstration at the Jujuy plaza. Morales accused the organizations that compose the Tupac Amaru of keeping the social welfare money for themselves, and distributing it only to their political supporters. To reduce their influence, he arranged that those payments should be done through bank accounts and not with cash, to keep track of the money. After a month, he urged the organizations to accept the terms and leave the plaza, or he would revoke their legal authorizations. The Tupac Amaru was split by this, as most organizations accepted Morales' proposal, but Sala and a reduced faction rejected it. Milagro Sala was arrested a few days later, accused of calling to riots and civil disorder.

Political offices
Preceded by Eduardo Fellner	Governor of Jujuy; 2015–2023	Succeeded by Carlos Sadir
Party political offices
Preceded by Roberto Iglesias	President of the National Committee of the Radical Civic Union; 2006–2009	Succeeded by Ernesto Sanz
Preceded by Alfredo Cornejo	President of the National Committee of the Radical Civic Union; 2021–2023	Succeeded by Martín Lousteau
