= Gobernador Horacio Guzmán International Airport =

Airport in Argentina

Gobernador Horacio Guzmán International Airport Aeropuerto Internacional de Jujuy - Gobernador Horacio Guzmán
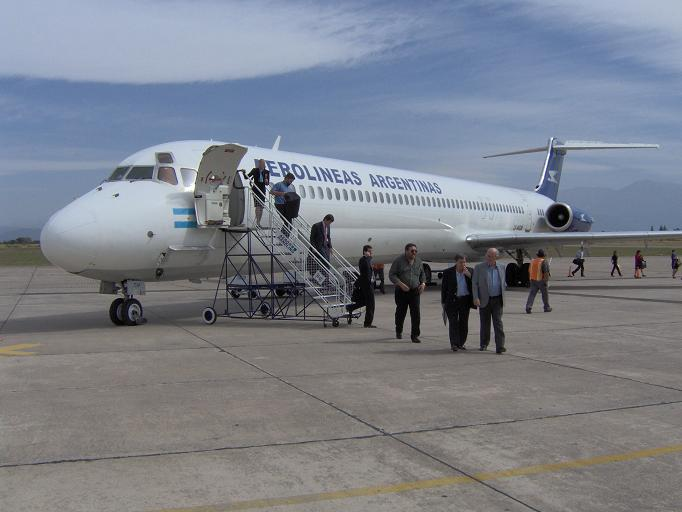
- IATA: JUJ; ICAO: SASJ

Summary
- Airport type: Public
- Operator: Aeropuertos Argentina 2000
- Serves: Jujuy, Argentina
- Location: Ciudad Perico
- Elevation AMSL: 3,019 ft (920 m)
- Coordinates: 24°23′20″S 65°06′00″W

Map
- Location of airport in Argentina

Runways
Direction	Length		Surface
Direction	m	ft	Surface
16/34	2,945	9,662	Asphalt

Statistics (2017)
- Passengers: 272,644
- Passenger change 16–17: ▲16.72%
- Aircraft movements: 4,248
- Movements change 16–17: ▲7.13%
- Source: EANA Google Maps SkyVector

Gobernador Horacio Guzmán International Airport (Spanish: Aeropuerto Internacional de Jujuy - Gobernador Horacio Guzmán) (IATA: JUJ, ICAO: SASJ), or Jujuy Airport, is an airport in Jujuy Province, Argentina serving the city of San Salvador de Jujuy. It is the northernmost Argentinian airport served by scheduled flights. It is located 33 km (21 mi) southeast of the city in Ciudad Perico.

Inaugurated by Governor Darío Arias on April 19, 1967, it was originally named Aeropuerto El Cadillal. The airport was renamed in 1992 after Dr. Horacio Guzmán, governor for most of the period between 1958 and 1964, and by whose initiative the facility was built. It is operated by Aeropuertos Argentina 2000.

Aerolíneas Argentinas used Jujuy Airport before for refuelling long flights to Bogotá, Los Angeles, Mexico City and Lima. In 1980, the airline was operating scheduled Boeing 707 passenger flights from the airport direct to Miami once a week via a stop in Bogota.

A new terminal was constructed between 2019 and 2020, that expanded the airport's operating capacity, making it capable of operating up to four flights simultaneously: two through jet bridges and two remotely, with which it could handle more than four hundred passengers per hour. Each of its jet bridges is ready to receive international flights.

== Airlines and destinations ==
Airlines	Destinations
Aerolíneas Argentinas	Buenos Aires–Aeroparque, Buenos Aires–Ezeiza, Córdoba (AR), Mendoza, Puerto Iguazú
JetSmart Argentina	Buenos Aires–Aeroparque
JOY Airline	Buenos Aires–Aeroparque, Córdoba (AR)
Paranair	Asunción

== Statistics ==
Traffic by calendar year. Official ACI Statistics
	Passengers	Change from previous year	Aircraft operations	Change from previous year	Cargo (metric tons)	Change from previous year
2008	47,644	N.A.	1,120	N.A.	236	N.A.
2009	91,263	▲91.55%	2,066	▲84.46%	163	▼30.93%
2010	95,971	▲5.16%	2,203	▲6.63%	158	▼3.07%
Source: Airports Council International. World Airport Traffic Statistics (Years 2005-2010)

== See also ==
- Transport in Argentina
- List of airports in Argentina
