= Iván Almasana =

Argentine footballer

Personal information
- Full name: Pedro Iván Almasana
- Date of birth: 2 October 1993 (age 33)
- Place of birth: San Salvador de Jujuy, Argentina
- Positions: Defender; midfielder

Senior career*
Years	Team	Apps	(Gls)
2015–2017	Gimnasia y Esgrima	6	(0)
2016–2017	→ Altos Hornos Zapla (loan)	14	(0)
- * Club domestic league appearances and goals as of 08:08, 7 January 2019 (UTC)

Pedro Iván Almasana (born 2 October 1993) is an Argentine professional footballer who plays as a defender or midfielder.

== Career ==
Almasana started his career with Gimnasia y Esgrima. He made his professional bow during a goalless draw away to Juventud Unida on 22 February 2015, while his first start arrived in April against Unión Mar del Plata. Almasana participated in six overall matches in the 2015 Primera B Nacional campaign. June 2016 saw Almasana leave on loan, signing for Altos Hornos Zapla of Torneo Federal A. Fourteen appearances followed in tier three, along with a sole appearance in the Copa Argentina over Gimnasia y Tiro.

== Career statistics ==
As of 7 January 2019.

Club statistics
Club	Season	League			Cup		Continental		Other		Total	
Club	Season	Division	Apps	Goals	Apps	Goals	Apps	Goals	Apps	Goals	Apps	Goals
Gimnasia y Esgrima	2015	Primera B Nacional	6	0	0	0	—		0	0	6	0
Gimnasia y Esgrima	2016	Primera B Nacional	0	0	0	0	—		0	0	0	0
Gimnasia y Esgrima	2016–17	Primera B Nacional	0	0	0	0	—		0	0	0	0
Gimnasia y Esgrima	2017–18	Primera B Nacional	0	0	0	0	—		0	0	0	0
Gimnasia y Esgrima	2018–19	Primera B Nacional	0	0	0	0	—		0	0	0	0
Gimnasia y Esgrima	Total		6	0	0	0	—		0	0	6	0
Altos Hornos Zapla (loan)	2016–17	Torneo Federal A	14	0	1	0	—		0	0	15	0
Career total			20	0	1	0	—		0	0	21	0
