= Milagro Sala =

Argentine politician

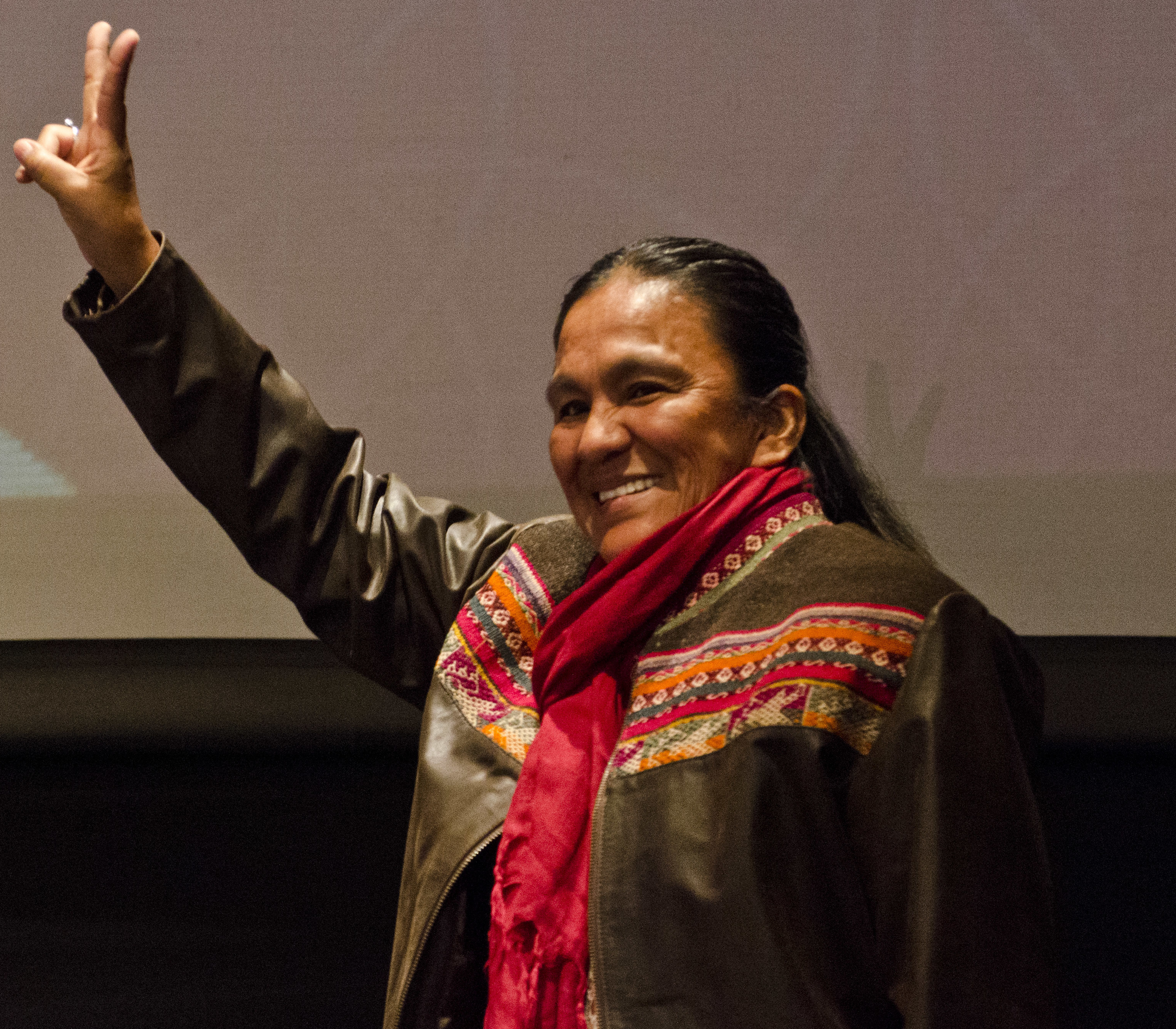
- Born: 27 January 1964 (age 62); San Salvador de Jujuy, Argentina
- Occupation: President of the Tupac Amaru Neighborhood Association

Milagro Amalia Ángela Sala (born 27 January 1964) is a leader of the Tupac Amaru neighborhood association, part of the Association of State Workers (ATE) of Jujuy, and a leading figure in the Movimiento piquetero of Argentina.

On 16 January 2016, Sala was arrested on charges of fraud and criminal conspiracy in an alleged embezzlement of ARS $30,000,000 intended by the government to help the poor.

Several human rights organizations, like Amnesty International, denounced Argentina's government at the Working Group on Arbitrary Detention (GAD) of the United Nations, alleging the illegal detention of Milagro Sala. The Argentina government considered that the GAD decision was advisory only.

== Early life ==
Sala was born in the Lower Azopardo neighborhood of San Salvador de Jujuy. At 15 years old she discovered that she was adopted and that her biological mother had abandoned her in a cardboard box in front of a hospital. She left the house where she was raised. She lived for years among hustlers, drug dealers, thieves and prostitutes. She was a shoe shiner, robbed with her friends, and abused narcotics; at age 18 she was caught and jailed. There, she organized a hunger strike that resulted in her being allowed to cook for her fellow female prisoners, with better food at equal cost. She spent eight months in prison, and counseled other Lower Azopardo prostitutes toward changing their situation and leaving that environment.

Sala subsequently joined the Argentine Workers' Center (CTA). She gained nationwide notoriety for the power she obtained in the province of Jujuy through the Asociacion barrial Tupac Amaru (Tupac Amaru neighborhood association). This NGO manages a 200 million peso (us$50 million) budget, at least 40 vehicles, and over 300 firearms registered in RENAR. Its influence led to conflict with conservative political figures in Jujuy, however, and following a series of exchanged accusations. She's also had charges filed for death threats and destruction of property by Senator Gerardo Morales. She denied involvement in a 2009 incident in which two youths attacked Morales, asserting that the accusations are politically motivated and without proof.

She is the mother of two children, and the adoptive mother of twelve.

== Asociación barrial Tupac Amaru ==
Tupac Amaru receives 7.9 million pesos (us$1.9 million) per month for public housing construction subsidies from the National Government. It includes 70,000 affiliates, whose membership is requisite in keeping their children in school, where applicable. Members form housing cooperatives through which government subsidies are channeled, and which completed 3,000 housing units by the end of 2009. The organization also manages six factories employing 5,000 workers in the construction material, tool and die, and textile industries. It maintains two schools and a clinic equipped with an MRI scanner.

The political ideology of the Tupac Amaru organization is represented by the historical figures of Tupac Amaru, Che Guevara and Eva Perón. They consider themselves indigenista, proclaiming the government of Bolivian President Evo Morales as a political model.

Sala attributes many of the accusations against the group and herself to racism, affirming that "we will be investigated, while there was corruption among companies. I am dark skinned, and a Kolla, but I´m not stupid."

Tupac Amaru established branches elsewhere in Argentina, including Salta, Tucumán, Santiago del Estero, Buenos Aires (the Villa 31), and Mendoza; these new chapters total 16 organizations.

Gerardo Morales was elected governor in 2015, and denounced that Sala may have committed financial fraud and a discretional use of the money. Morales ordered that the organizations trusted with the payment of subsidies should do so through bank accounts, so that the money can be traced. Most organizations agreed with the proposal, breaking up the Tupac Amaru organization. Sala, who started a demonstration in the main plaza of Jujuy when Morales took office, refused to do so. She also refused to leave the plaza after a month of staying there. She was eventually detained, accused of public disorder.

Amnesty International considers “that Milagro Sala is being criminalized for peacefully exercising her rights to freedom of expression and protest” and, along with other human rights groups, have called for the granting of precautionary measures to guarantee the liberty of Milagro Sala, along with the exercise of freedom of expression and the right to social protest in Argentina.

== Prison ==
In 2019 she was sentenced to 13 years in prison for extortion and being the head of an illicit association. She maintains her innocence and her defence will appeal the decision.
