= Walter Barrionuevo =

Argentine politician

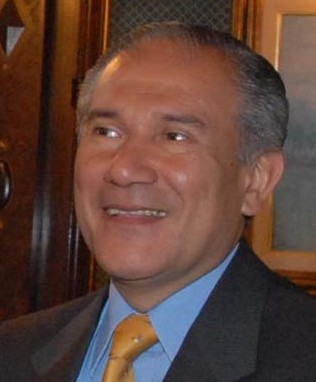

National Senator
- In office 10 December 2011 – 10 December 2017
- Constituency: Jujuy

Governor of Jujuy
- In office 10 December 2007 – 9 December 2011
- Vice Governor: Pedro Segura
- Preceded by: Eduardo Fellner
- Succeeded by: Eduardo Fellner

Vice Governor of Jujuy
- In office 10 December 2003 – 9 December 2007
- Governor: Eduardo Fellner
- Preceded by: Rubén Daza
- Succeeded by: Pedro Segura

Personal details
- Born: 28 February 1954 (age 72) Frías, Santiago del Estero Province
- Party: Justicialist Party
- Profession: Lawyer

Walter Basilio Barrionuevo (born 28 February 1954) is an Argentine Justicialist Party (PJ) politician, and governor of Jujuy Province.

Born in Frías, Santiago del Estero Province, Barrionuevo enrolled at the National University of Tucumán, where he earned a law degree in 1976. He relocated to Jujuy Province, and between 1989 and 1990 was appointed Minister of Government, Justice, and Education by Governor Ricardo de Aparici. He returned to Santiago del Estero as President of the Supreme Justice Tribunal from 1994 to 1995. He was elected to the Jujuy Chamber of Deputies in 1995, and in 1999 was elected president of the Justicialist Party caucus.

He served briefly as Minister of Education in 1999 for the newly appointed Governor Eduardo Fellner, and in 2003 was elected vice-governor as the latter's running mate.

Barrionuevo was elected Governor in October 2007 with 35.8% of the vote, on the Front for Victory ticket of President Néstor Kirchner. He was elected Senator in 2011.

Preceded by Eduardo Fellner	Governor of Jujuy; 2007—2011	Succeeded by Eduardo Fellner
