= Legislature of Jujuy =

Legislative body of Jujuy Province, Argentina

Type
- Type: Unicameral

Leadership
- President (Vice Governor): Carlos Haquim (CJ) since 10 December 2015
- First Vice President: Juan Carlos Abud Robles (UCR) since 10 December 2019
- Second Vice President: Pedro Horacio Belizán (FDT–PJ) since 10 December 2019

Structure
- Seats: 48 legislators
- Political groups: Government (30): UCR (26); Jujuy First (4); Opposition (18): FDT–PJ (14); JxJ–FDT; Independent (1)
- Length of term: 4 years
- Authority: Constitution of Jujuy

Elections
- Voting system: Proportional representation
- Last election: 27 June 2021
- Next election: May 7 2023

Website
- www.legislaturajujuy.gov.ar

The Legislature of Jujuy Province (Spanish: Legislatura la Provincia de Jujuy) is the unicameral legislative body of Jujuy Province, in Argentina. It convenes in the provincial capital, San Salvador de Jujuy.

It comprises 48 legislators elected in a single multi-member province-wide district through proportional representation using the D'Hondt method. Members are elected by halves in staggered elections for four-year terms every two years. There is, in addition, a 30% gender quota for female candidates in party lists.

The Legislature is presided by the vice governor of Jujuy, who is elected alongside the governor every four years. Since 2015, Carlos Haquim of the Cambia Jujuy coalition, elected alongside Gerardo Morales, has been vice governor and president of the Legislature.

== History ==
The legislative power of Jujuy was established in 1835, when the territory split from Salta and declared its provincial autonomy. Upon the proclamation of Jujuy Province, elections for deputies to a convention to draft its first constitution were held. This first "Honourable General Constituent Junta of the Free and Independent Province of Jujuy" comprised 13 deputies: four for the city of San Salvador, and one for each of the remaining eight departments of the province at the time (Tumbaya, Humahuaca, Yavi, Santa Catalina, Cochinoca, Rinconada, Perico, and Río Negro). The body's first provisional president was Manuel Ignacio del Portal.

This first General Constituent Junta finished drafting the province's constitution on 29 November 1835, and, in 1836, the national government based in Buenos Aires officially recognised the province's autonomy. Political instability would hamper the Junta's regular work until 1837. Constitutional reforms would take place in 1839, 1851, and 1935, but they did not alter the province's electoral system and the legal framework wherein the legislature operated. Deputies to the legislature would continue to be directly elected in the departments (with the exception of the Capital Department, corresponding to San Salvador) until the 1850s, when population growth in the peripheries of the capital led to progressive increases in members elected in each of the departments.

In 1949, during the first presidency of Juan Perón, a new provincial constitution was adopted and for the first time the simple plurality system in a single province-wide district was employed to elect members to the Legislature. In addition, members would be elected in halves for four-year terms, and the chamber would be presided by the democratically elected Vice Governor. This system remained in place until the adoption of a new provincial constitution in 1986, following the return of democracy after the 1976–1983 military dictatorship. This new constitution mandated the use of the proportional representation.

== Bibliography ==
- Bidondo, Jorge A. (2005). Notas para la historia de la legislatura jujeña. Jujuy: Cuadernos del Duende. ISBN 987-1212-04-6.
