= Eduardo Fellner =

Argentine politician (born 1954)

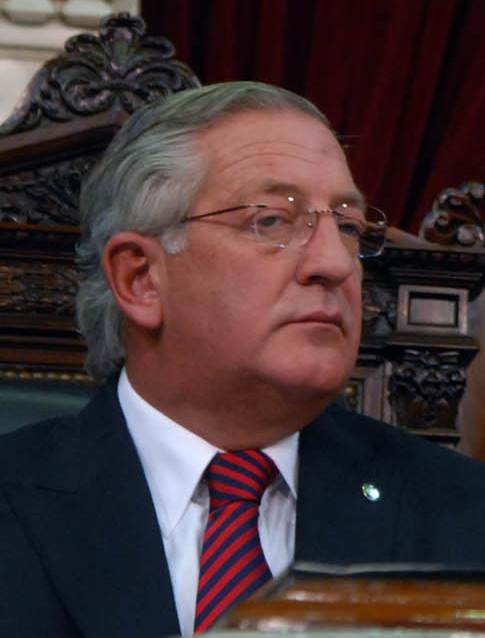
- Fellner in 2009

Governor of Jujuy
- In office 10 December 2011 – 10 December 2015
- Vice Governor: Guillermo Jenefes
- Preceded by: Walter Barrionuevo
- Succeeded by: Gerardo Morales
- In office 26 November 1998 – 10 December 2007
- Vice Governor: Rubén Daza; Walter Barrionuevo
- Preceded by: Carlos Ferraro
- Succeeded by: Walter Barrionuevo

President of the Chamber of Deputies
- In office 10 December 2007 – 10 December 2011
- Preceded by: Alberto Balestrini
- Succeeded by: Julián Domínguez

National Deputy
- In office 10 December 2007 – 10 December 2011
- Constituency: Jujuy

President of the Justicialist Party
- In office 9 May 2014 – 3 May 2016
- Preceded by: Daniel Scioli
- Succeeded by: José Luis Gioja

Personal details
- Born: 16 June 1954 (age 72) Río Tercero, Córdoba Province, Argentina
- Party: Justicialist Party
- Profession: Lawyer

Eduardo Alfredo Fellner (born 16 June 1954) is an Argentine Peronist politician. He was President of the Argentine Chamber of Deputies and governor of Jujuy Province for two terms.

== Life and times ==
Fellner was born in Río Tercero, Córdoba, and was raised in Villa Palpalá, Jujuy Province, where his father had found work in the Zapla steel mill, the country's oldest and largest. The young Fellner later relocated to Tucumán, where he earned a juris doctor at the Saint Thomas Aquinas University of the North. He returned to Jujuy in 1983, and was appointed Solicitor General of the province, later becoming District Attorney.

The Secretary of Industry, Juan Schiaretti, named Fellner his Minister of Government during President Carlos Menem's 1993 Federal intervention decree over the governor's post in Santiago del Estero Province. Fellner returned to Jujuy and was elected to the Provincial Legislature. Serving as President of the body by 1998, he first assumed the governor's post upon the resignation of Governor Carlos Ferraro.

Fellner was elected in his own right in 1999, and re-elected in 2003. He became the national leader of the Justicialist Party in 2004, chairing its national council. He resigned the same year, however, amid fallout from a row between Kirchnerists (supporters of then President Néstor Kirchner), to whom Fellner was loyal, and provincial party leaders.

Fellner attempted to change the provincial constitution ahead of the 2007 election so that he could stand for re-election for a third full term. He later stood for election to the Argentine Chamber of Deputies, and was sworn in during December 2007. Fellner was elected as President of the Chamber, and was only the second chamber president to not be from Buenos Aires Province; he was re-elected to the post in 2009.

Fellner was nominated as the Front for Victory candidate for Governor of Jujuy in 2011. He was returned to the post by voters with 57% of the total, defeating UCR candidate Mario Fiad by 31%.

Fellner's sister, Liliana Fellner, is a Senator for Jujuy.

Party political offices
Preceded by Daniel Scioli	President of the Justicialist Party; 2014–2016	Succeeded by José Luis Gioja
Political offices
Preceded by Carlos Ferraro	Governor of Jujuy; 1998–2007	Succeeded by Walter Barrionuevo
Preceded by Alberto Balestrini	President of the Chamber of Deputies; 2007–2011	Succeeded by Julián Domínguez
Preceded by Walter Barrionuevo	Governor of Jujuy; 2011–2015	Succeeded by Gerardo Morales
