= Governor of Jujuy Province =

- Provincial coat of Arms

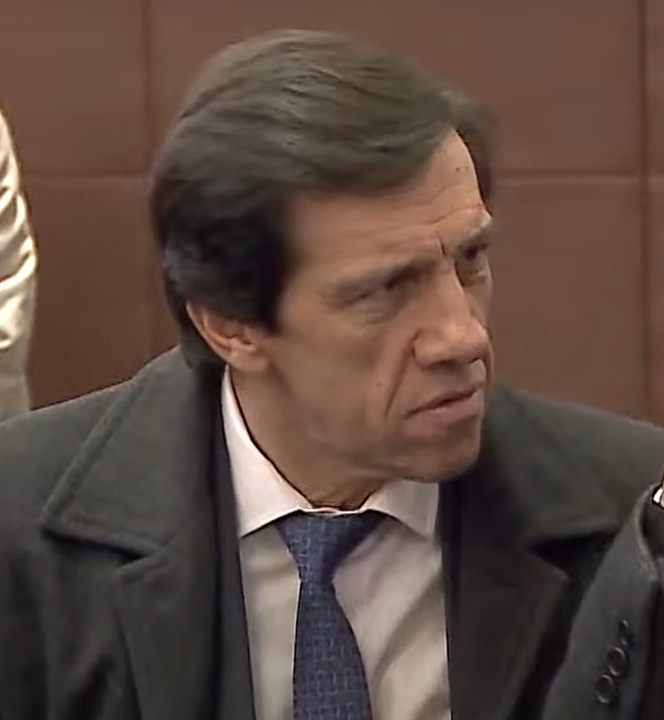
- Incumbent; Carlos Sadir since 10 December 2023
- Appointer: Direct popular vote
- Term length: 4 years
- Inaugural holder: José María Fascio

The Governor of Jujuy (Spanish: Gobernador de la Provincia de Jujuy) is a citizen of Jujuy Province, in Argentina, holding the office of governor for the corresponding period. The governor is elected alongside a vice-governor. Currently the governor of Jujuy is Carlos Sadir.

== Governors since 1983 ==
| Governor | Term in office | Party | Election | Vice Governor |
|---|---|---|---|---|
| Carlos Snopek | 10 December 1983 – 10 December 1987 | PJ | 1983 | Fernando Cabana |
| Ricardo de Aparici | 10 December 1987 – 7 November 1990 | PJ | 1987 | Eduardo Alderete |
| Eduardo Alderete | 7 November 1990 – 10 December 1991 | PJ | 1987 | Vacant |
| Ricardo Domínguez | 10 December 1991 – 1 June 1993 | PJ | 1991 | Carlos Ficoseco |
| Carlos Ficoseco | 1 June 1993 – 15 April 1994 | PJ | 1991 | Vacant |
| Oscar Perassi | 15 April 1994 – 10 December 1995 | PJ | —N/a | Vacant |
| Guillermo E. Snopek | 10 December 1995 – 25 February 1996 | PJ | 1995 | Carlos Ferraro |
| Carlos Ferraro | 25 February 1996 – 26 November 1998 | PJ | 1995 | Vacant |
| Eduardo Fellner | 26 November 1998 – 10 December 2007 | PJ | —N/a | Vacant |
| Eduardo Fellner | 26 November 1998 – 10 December 2007 | PJ | 1999 | Rubén Daza |
| Eduardo Fellner | 26 November 1998 – 10 December 2007 | PJ | 2003 | Walter Barrionuevo |
| Walter Barrionuevo | 10 December 2007 – 10 December 2011 | PJ | 2007 | Pedro Segura |
| Eduardo Fellner | 10 December 2011 – 10 December 2015 | PJ | 2007 | Guillermo Jenefes |
| Gerardo Morales | 10 December 2015 – 10 December 2023 | UCR | 2015 | Carlos Haquim |
| Gerardo Morales | 10 December 2015 – 10 December 2023 | UCR | 2019 | Carlos Haquim |
| Carlos Sadir | 10 December 2023 – Incumbent | UCR | 2023 | Alberto Bernis |

== See also ==
- Legislature of Jujuy
