= National University of Jujuy =

- Universidad Nacional de Jujuy
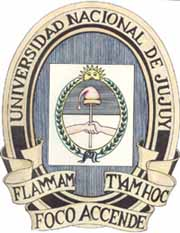
- Type: Public
- Established: 1973
- Academic staff: 1,385
- Students: 11,726
- Location: San Salvador de Jujuy, Jujuy, Argentina
- Website: http://www.unju.edu.ar/

The National University of Jujuy (Spanish: Universidad Nacional de Jujuy, UNJU) is an Argentine national university, situated in the city of San Salvador de Jujuy, capital of Jujuy Province.

Its precursor, the Instituto Superior de Ciencias Económicas (Economic Sciences Institute), was established by Governor Horacio Guzmán in 1959. Redesignated the Provincial University of Jujuy in 1972, a program of decentralization of the country's national university system, as outlined by presidential adviser Dr. Alberto Taquini, resulted in the school's formal establishment as such on November 11, 1973.

The university maintains sixteen schools and five institutes, the latter of which are specialized in mining, geology, and zoology. It also operates an FM radio station, UNJu, and a publisher, EdiUNJu.

== See also ==
- Science and Education in Argentina
- Argentine Higher Education Official Site
- Argentine Universities
