= San Salvador de Jujuy =

- City
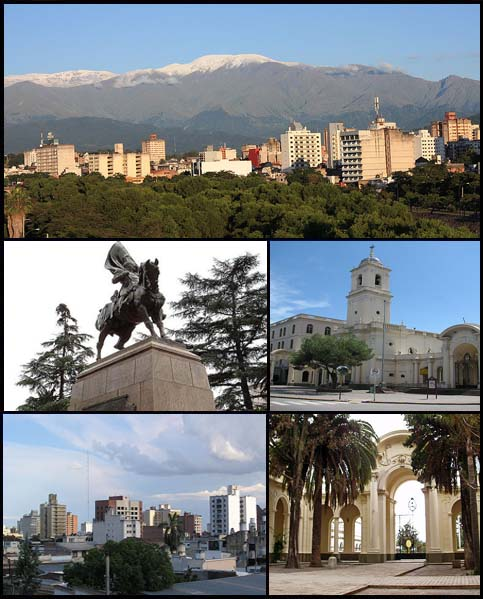
- (From top to bottom; from left to right) View of the city; Monument to Belgrano; Cathedral of St. Francis; Downtown and Patio of the Cathedral Church

- Coat of arms

- Location of San Salvador de Jujuy in Argentina San Salvador de Jujuy (Argentina)
- Coordinates: 24°11′S 65°18′W
- Country: Argentina
- Province: Jujuy
- Department: Doctor Manuel Belgrano
- Founded: April 19, 1593

Government
  - Intendant: Raúl Jorge (UCR)

Area
  - City: 19 km^{2} (7.3 sq mi)
- Elevation: 1,259 m (4,131 ft)

Population (2010)
  - Urban: 257,970
- Demonym: Jujeño
- Time zone: UTC−3 (ART)
- CPA base: Y4600
- Dialing code: +54 388
- Website: Official website

San Salvador de Jujuy (Spanish pronunciation: [san salβaˈðoɾ ðe xuˈxuj]), commonly known as Jujuy and locally often referred to as San Salvador, is the capital and largest city of Jujuy Province in northwest Argentina. Also, it is the seat of the Doctor Manuel Belgrano Department. It lies near the southern end of the Humahuaca Canyon where wooded hills meet the lowlands.

Its population at the 2001 census [INDEC] was 237,751 inhabitants. If its suburbs are included, this figure rises to around 300,000. The current mayor is Raúl Jorge.

== City information ==
The city lies on National Route 9 that connects La Quiaca 289 km (180 mi) with Salta 120 km (75 mi), and it is 1,525 km (948 mi) from Buenos Aires. Tourist destinations not far from the city are Tilcara 84 km (52 mi), Humahuaca 126 km (78 mi), and the Calilegua National Park 111 km (69 mi).

Jujuy is located near the Andes, at the junction of the Xibi Xibi River and the Río Grande de Jujuy, 1,238 meters above sea level. The weather is humid during the summer and dry and cold during the winter. Temperatures vary widely between day and night.

The city is the provincial government, financial and cultural centre. Most administrative offices related to economic activities that take place in other parts of the province are located here; these activities include petroleum extraction and pre-processing, sugarcane and sugar industry (Ledesma), tobacco (El Carmen, 10 km (6.2 mi) south), steel (in nearby Villa Palpalá), citrus, and fruit and vegetable production for local consumption.

The city has a colonial city centre including the Cabildo, the cathedral, and colorful Andean carnivals.

The Gobernador Horacio Guzmán International Airport (IATA: JUJ, ICAO: SASJ) at coordinates 24°24′00″S 65°05′00″W, is 33 km (21 mi) southeast of the city (in Ciudad Perico) and has regular flights to Buenos Aires.

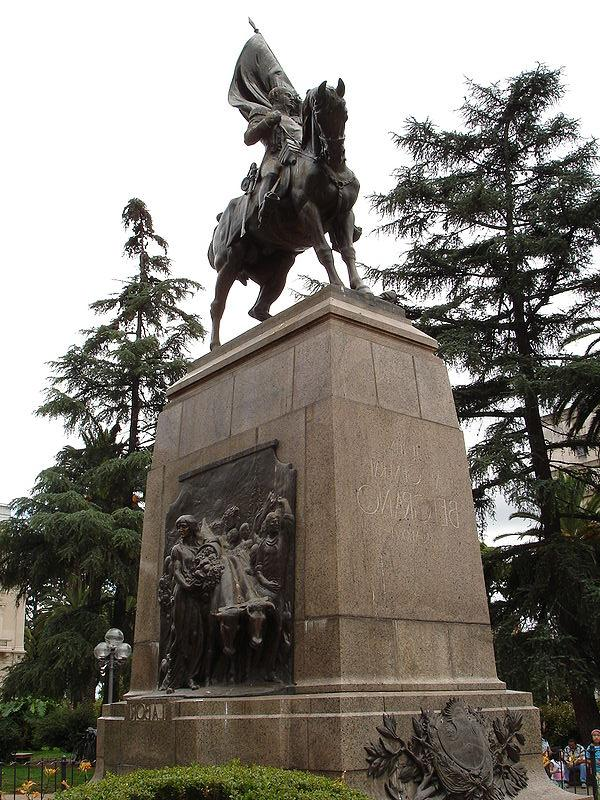
Monument to Manuel Belgrano

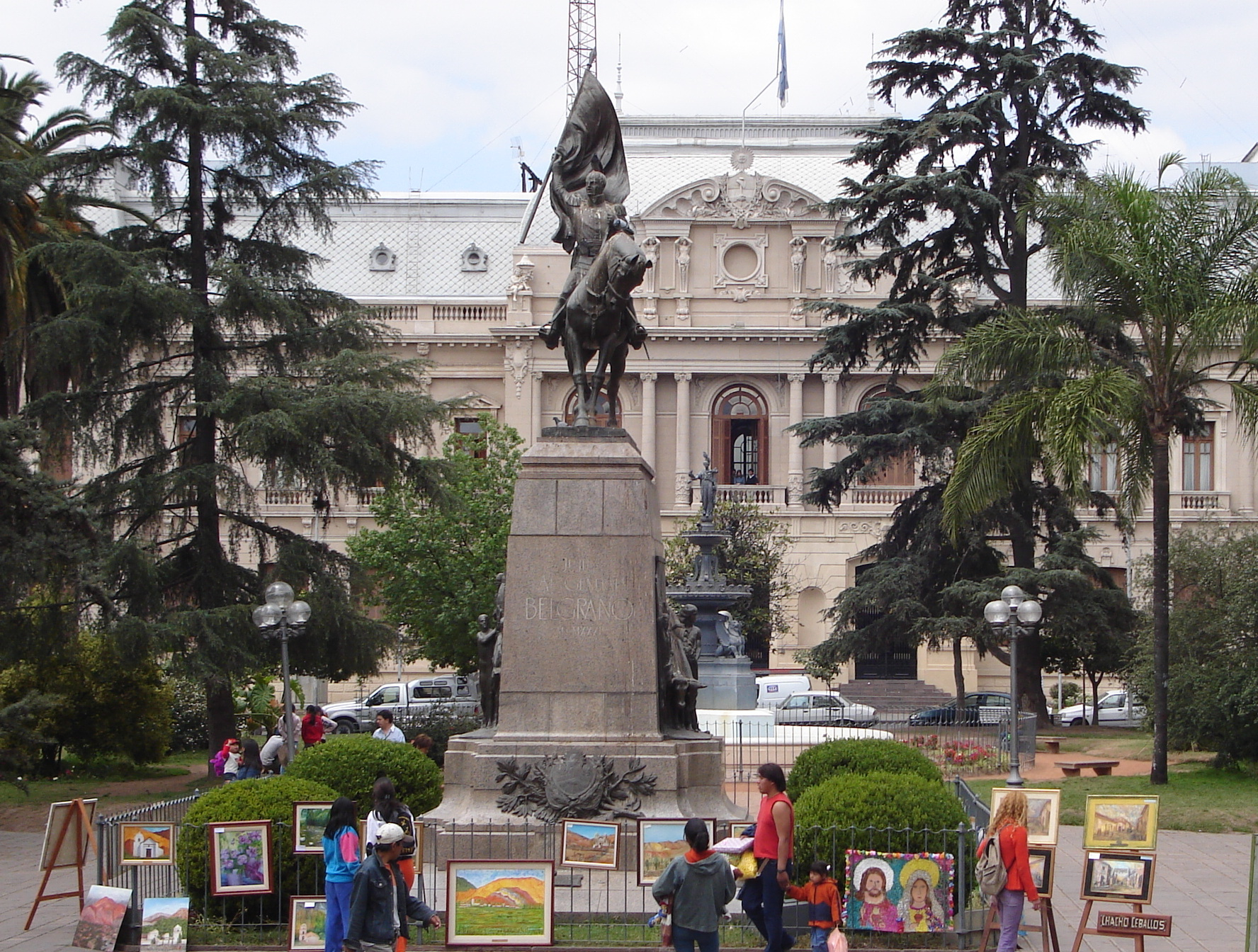
Belgrano Square and the Government Palace

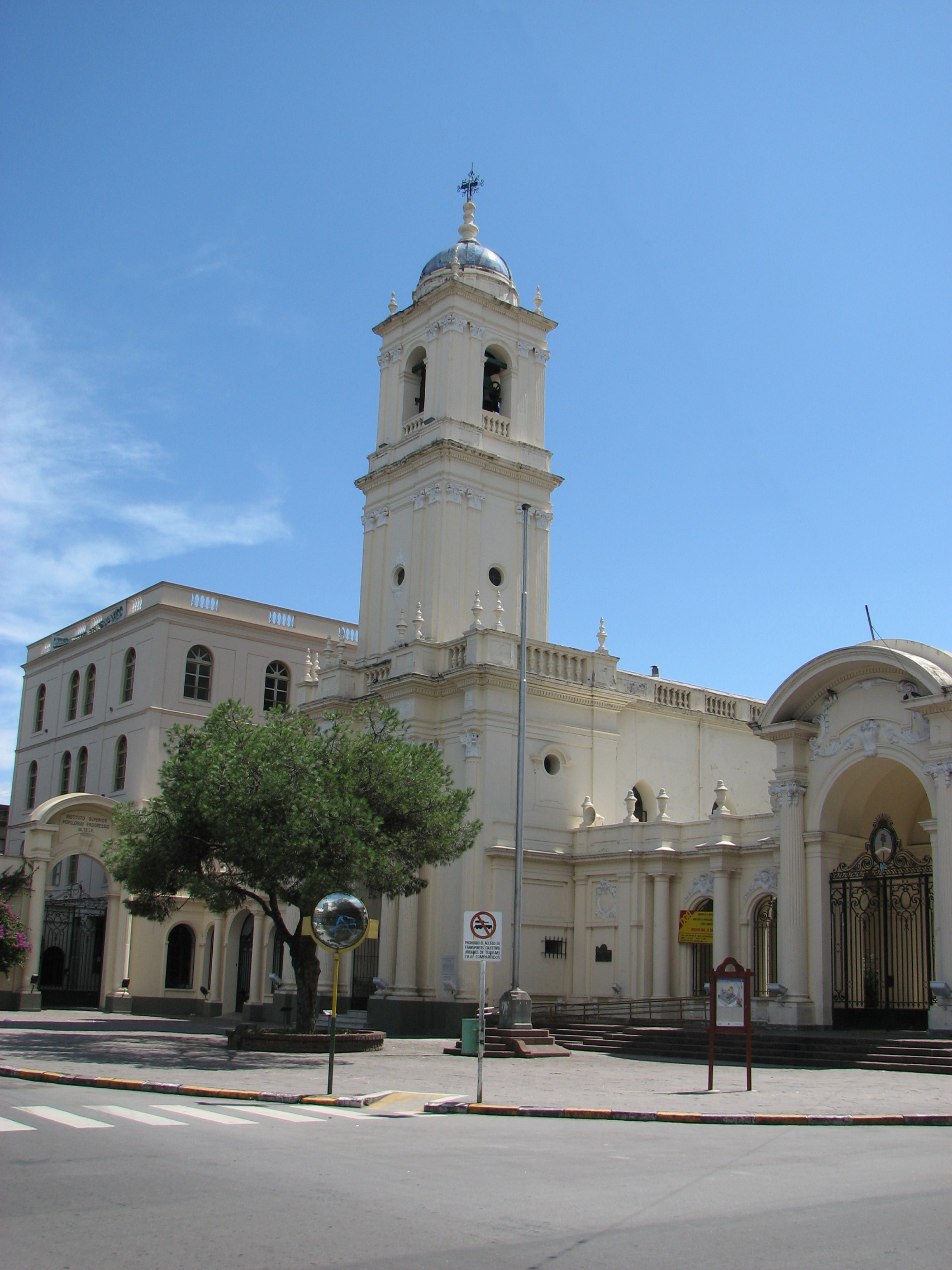
Cathedral of St. Francis

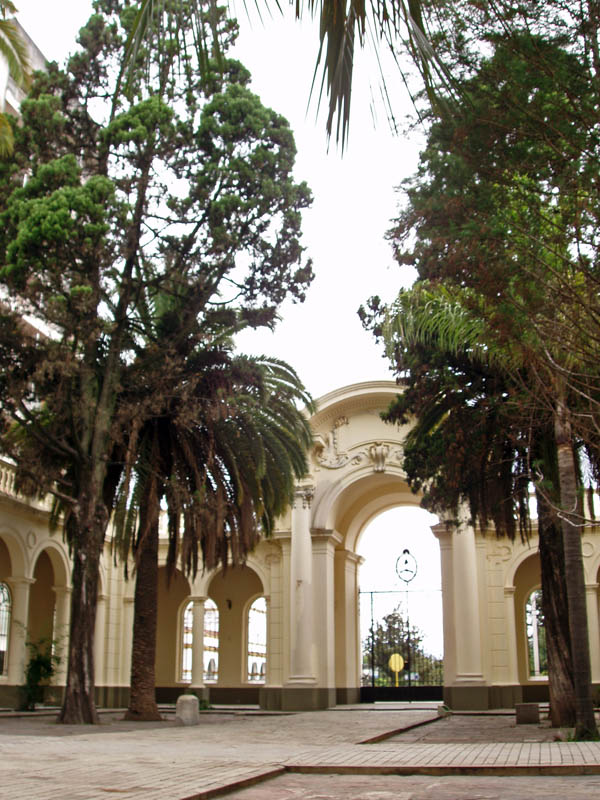
Patio of the Cathedral Church

== History ==
In late 1535 Jujuy was the site of a confrontation between a party of Diego de Almagro's expedition to Chile and local indigenous men. As the expedition's forces were concentrated in Tupiza a small party was sent to forage to Jujuy, a few expeditionaries were then killed which prompted Diego de Almagro to dispatch a 80-men strong punitive expedition that dislodged hostile forces that had fortified in a pucará in the Jujuy area.

After previous attempts in 1565 and 1592, the current city was founded as San Salvador de Velazco en el Valle de Jujuy on April 19, 1593, by Francisco de Argañarás y Murguía. The settlement initially developed as a strategic site on the mule trade route between San Miguel de Tucumán and the silver mines in Potosí, Bolivia.

Reaching its peak importance during the colonial period, San Salvador de Jujuy declined to the status of a remote provincial capital after the Argentine Declaration of Independence in 1816. The town became the capital of Jujuy Province when the latter separated from Salta Province in 1834. The 1863 Jujuy earthquake leveled the town, and it recovered slowly in the following decades. Jujuy began to grow following the arrival of the Northern Central Railway in 1900. Its first institution of higher learning, the Economic Sciences Institute, was established in 1959, and was incorporated into the new National University of Jujuy in 1973. The city was the location of a number of Argentine films, including Veronico Cruz (1988) and Una estrella y dos cafés (2005). The city's impoverished Lower Azopardo neighborhood would later give rise to Milagro Sala's Indigenist Tupac Amaru Neighborhood Association.

== Climate ==
Jujuy has a humid subtropical climate (Cwa, according to the Köppen climate classification), mainly because of the altitude. Summers bring warm days at 28 °C (82 °F) and nights at 16 °C (61 °F) with frequent thunderstorms. The rest of the year is sunny, with temperatures at about 24 °C (75 °F) during the day and 11 °C (52 °F) at night, crisp, dry winters with warm days of 19 °C (66 °F) and cold nights at 6 °C (43 °F), and sunny springs with warm days at 26 °C (79 °F) and cool nights at 11 °C (52 °F). During heat waves, temperatures can sometimes reach 35 °C (95 °F) but these are not frequent and nights always bring significant cooling, as opposed to many low-lying areas in Northern Argentina. During the winter, the record low has fallen to −7 °C (19 °F). Precipitation is about 800 mm (31 in), which falls in the form of thunderstorms during the warmest months. The highest temperature recorded was 42 °C (108 °F) on October 16, 2014 while the lowest temperature recorded was −6.9 °C (19.6 °F) on August 14, 1978.

Climate data for San Salvador de Jujuy (Gobernador Horacio Guzmán International Airport) 1991–2020, extremes 1968–present
Month	Jan	Feb	Mar	Apr	May	Jun	Jul	Aug	Sep	Oct	Nov	Dec	Year
Record high °C (°F)	40.2 (104.4)	38.4 (101.1)	39.8 (103.6)	34.5 (94.1)	33.9 (93.0)	34.1 (93.4)	39.9 (103.8)	38.0 (100.4)	41.3 (106.3)	42.4 (108.3)	41.7 (107.1)	42.0 (107.6)	42.4 (108.3)
Mean daily maximum °C (°F)	30.3 (86.5)	28.8 (83.8)	27.1 (80.8)	24.3 (75.7)	21.3 (70.3)	19.9 (67.8)	20.1 (68.2)	23.6 (74.5)	26.4 (79.5)	29.0 (84.2)	30.0 (86.0)	30.7 (87.3)	26.0 (78.8)
Daily mean °C (°F)	23.8 (74.8)	22.7 (72.9)	21.3 (70.3)	18.5 (65.3)	15.1 (59.2)	12.5 (54.5)	11.9 (53.4)	15.1 (59.2)	18.4 (65.1)	21.9 (71.4)	23.1 (73.6)	24.0 (75.2)	19.0 (66.2)
Mean daily minimum °C (°F)	18.5 (65.3)	17.9 (64.2)	17.0 (62.6)	14.1 (57.4)	10.4 (50.7)	7.3 (45.1)	6.0 (42.8)	8.2 (46.8)	11.0 (51.8)	15.1 (59.2)	16.7 (62.1)	18.1 (64.6)	13.4 (56.1)
Record low °C (°F)	9.4 (48.9)	7.5 (45.5)	7.7 (45.9)	1.5 (34.7)	−1.9 (28.6)	−6.0 (21.2)	−6.0 (21.2)	−6.9 (19.6)	−1.8 (28.8)	1.8 (35.2)	4.2 (39.6)	8.5 (47.3)	−6.9 (19.6)
Average precipitation mm (inches)	147.6 (5.81)	154.0 (6.06)	131.8 (5.19)	51.7 (2.04)	13.6 (0.54)	4.3 (0.17)	2.8 (0.11)	2.1 (0.08)	5.1 (0.20)	28.8 (1.13)	56.1 (2.21)	122.5 (4.82)	720.4 (28.36)
Average precipitation days (≥ 0.1 mm)	13.4	12.6	13.5	9.0	4.2	2.6	2.0	1.0	1.8	4.9	7.4	11.5	83.9
Average snowy days	0.0	0.0	0.0	0.0	0.0	0.1	0.2	0.0	0.0	0.0	0.0	0.0	0.2
Average relative humidity (%)	73.2	77.5	81.1	81.5	79.3	75.9	67.1	55.7	50.0	55.7	60.7	67.3	68.8
Mean monthly sunshine hours	213.9	175.2	167.4	150.0	158.1	165.0	201.5	220.1	210.0	210.8	213.0	213.9	2,298.9
Mean daily sunshine hours	6.9	6.2	5.4	5.0	5.1	5.5	6.5	7.1	7.0	6.8	7.1	6.9	6.3
Percentage possible sunshine	55	53	46	49	57	47	62	62	57	52	51	54	54
Source 1: Servicio Meteorológico Nacional
Source 2: UNLP (percent sun only 1971–1980)

Climate data for San Salvador de Jujuy (National University of Jujuy) 1991–2020 normals, extremes 1987–present
Month	Jan	Feb	Mar	Apr	May	Jun	Jul	Aug	Sep	Oct	Nov	Dec	Year
Record high °C (°F)	37.4 (99.3)	35.0 (95.0)	34.0 (93.2)	31.5 (88.7)	32.2 (90.0)	35.2 (95.4)	36.2 (97.2)	37.6 (99.7)	38.0 (100.4)	39.8 (103.6)	40.0 (104.0)	38.1 (100.6)	40.0 (104.0)
Mean daily maximum °C (°F)	27.3 (81.1)	26.2 (79.2)	24.8 (76.6)	22.4 (72.3)	19.6 (67.3)	18.6 (65.5)	18.6 (65.5)	21.7 (71.1)	24.0 (75.2)	26.4 (79.5)	27.1 (80.8)	27.7 (81.9)	23.7 (74.7)
Daily mean °C (°F)	21.1 (70.0)	20.2 (68.4)	19.1 (66.4)	16.6 (61.9)	13.4 (56.1)	11.1 (52.0)	10.2 (50.4)	13.0 (55.4)	15.7 (60.3)	19.0 (66.2)	20.2 (68.4)	21.3 (70.3)	16.7 (62.1)
Mean daily minimum °C (°F)	16.7 (62.1)	16.2 (61.2)	15.5 (59.9)	12.7 (54.9)	9.1 (48.4)	5.9 (42.6)	4.5 (40.1)	6.4 (43.5)	9.1 (48.4)	12.9 (55.2)	14.6 (58.3)	16.2 (61.2)	11.7 (53.1)
Record low °C (°F)	9.1 (48.4)	5.7 (42.3)	6.9 (44.4)	0.9 (33.6)	−2.6 (27.3)	−4.0 (24.8)	−6.4 (20.5)	−4.8 (23.4)	−3.4 (25.9)	1.7 (35.1)	2.9 (37.2)	7.4 (45.3)	−6.4 (20.5)
Average precipitation mm (inches)	191.5 (7.54)	188.0 (7.40)	166.5 (6.56)	62.0 (2.44)	20.9 (0.82)	9.5 (0.37)	7.1 (0.28)	5.9 (0.23)	9.4 (0.37)	40.8 (1.61)	97.5 (3.84)	152.1 (5.99)	951.1 (37.44)
Average precipitation days (≥ 0.1 mm)	16.7	15.7	15.4	10.1	6.5	4.3	3.7	2.9	3.7	7.6	10.7	14.5	111.8
Average snowy days	0.0	0.0	0.0	0.0	0.1	0.1	0.3	0.2	0.1	0.0	0.0	0.0	0.7
Average relative humidity (%)	80.7	83.7	84.9	84.7	83.0	79.3	74.1	65.3	62.6	67.0	71.1	77.0	76.1
Source: Servicio Meteorológico Nacional

== Notable people ==
- Iván Almasana (born 1993), Argentine professional footballer
- Ana Pelegrín (1938–2008), researcher, writer, and educator
- Cazzu (born 1993), Argentine rapper, singer, poet and writer

== See also ==
- List of twin towns and sister cities in Argentina
- Yolanda Carenzo (pianist born in San Salvador de Jujuy)
