= Brendon Villegas =

American television personality

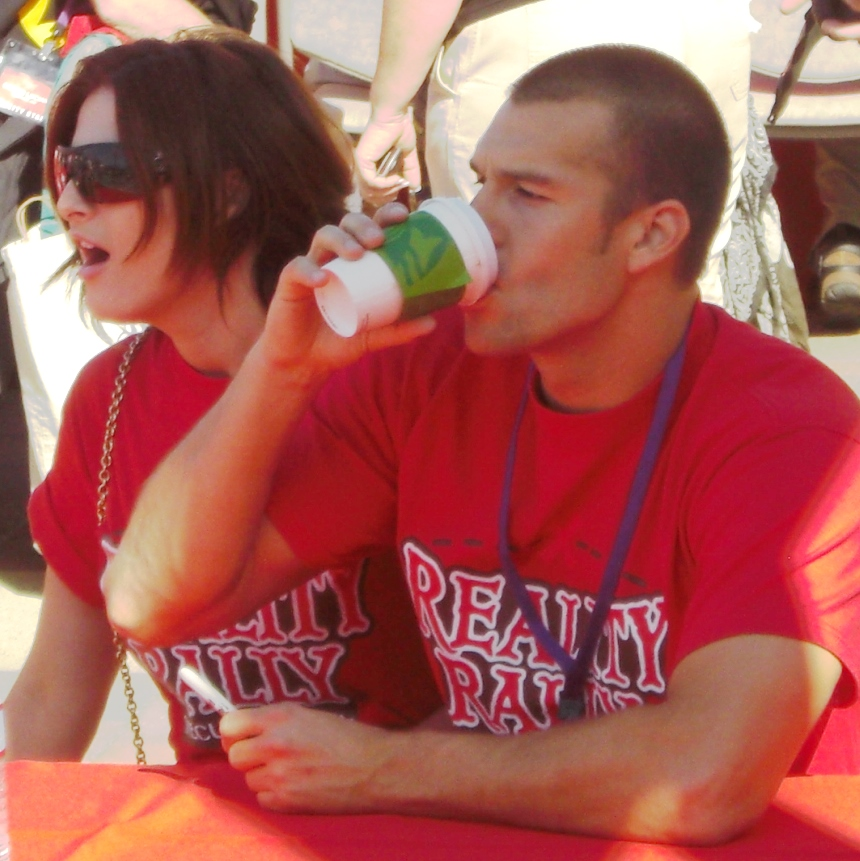
- Villegas (right) with wife Rachel Reilly
- Born: Brendon Josef Villegas; July 2, 1980 (age 46); Riverside, California, U.S.
- Education: UCLA
- Television: Big Brother 12; Big Brother 13; The Amazing Race 20; The Amazing Race 24; Celebrity Fear Factor (winner)
- Spouse: Rachel Reilly (m. 2012)
- Children: 2

Brendon Josef Villegas (born July 2, 1980) is an American television personality, reality show contestant, and university professor. Villegas appeared in two seasons each of the American edition of the television series Big Brother and The Amazing Race.

== Early life and education ==
Villegas is originally from Riverside, California. At the time he competed in The Amazing Race, he was a PhD candidate in biomedical physics at the University of California, Los Angeles.

== Reality shows ==
=== Big Brother ===
==== Season 12 ====
Villegas first appeared on 12th season of Big Brother in 2010. He began a "showmance" with fellow contestant Rachel Reilly. In week five he was put up for eviction alongside his show-mantic partner Reilly by HOH Matt. In week six, he won HOH and nominated Lane and Ragan. Brendon was nominated by Britney in week seven, alongside Enzo, however he saved himself when he won the POV and Matt replaced him as a nominee. Before HouseGuest Matt was evicted it was announced that it was double eviction day. Brendon and Ragan were nominated by Hayden for eviction, but after Ragan won the power of veto, Brendon was evicted over replacement nominee Britney by a vote of 3–0. Brendon became the fourth Big Brother jury member this season after the immediate eviction of Matt. Brendon voted for Lane to win Big Brother.

==== Season 13 ====
Villegas was one of the returning houseguests in the "Double Trouble" twist. His partner is his fiancée Rachel Reilly. On day one, Brendon became immune from eviction when Rachel became the first HoH, and later became a part of the Veterans alliance. Brendon and Rachel won the Power of Veto as a team in week one in the competition, Faster than a Speeding Veto, but chose not to use it. In week three, Brendon again won the Power of Veto in the competition, Hot Legs, after spelling the word "Understanding", the same word that won him the veto last season. He chose not to use it, angering ally Daniele who had wanted him to use it against Jeff, causing a split in the Veterans alliance. In week four, Daniele became the new Head of Household, nominating Brendon and Rachel for eviction. On day 29, Brendon won the Power of Veto for the third time in four weeks in the competition, Time's Up, but later decided to use it on Rachel. On day 34, Brendon was evicted by a vote of 5–2 against Jordan, gaining the votes of Rachel and Porsche. However, on day 41, Brendon defeated Lawon in a competition entitled That's How We Roll to return to the house. On day 48, he was re-evicted by a vote of 5–1. Brendon is the second houseguest in Big Brother history to be evicted three times, the first being Big Brother 6/7 Kaysar Ridha. In the jury house, he seemed to be very good friends with Jeff. Brendon was the fifth evicted HouseGuest and the first jury member and voted for fiancé Rachel to win.

=== The Amazing Race ===
==== The Amazing Race 20 ====
Villegas and fiancé Rachel Reilly were on the 20th season of The Amazing Race, which premiered on February 19, 2012. They ended up in third place out of 11 teams in the final leg in The Amazing Race 20 losing to Border Patrol Agents of Art & JJ (runner-up) and Army Wife Rachel & Combat Pilot Dave, who won the race.

==== The Amazing Race 24 ====
Brendon Villegas and Rachel Reilly wed after their previous Amazing Race appearance, and competed again in the second All-Stars edition of The Amazing Race. He and Reilly won three legs, earning US$10,000 each and a trip to the Great Barrier Reef. However, in the end they came in third place for a second time, losing to former Stealing Angels vocalists Caroline Cutbirth and Jennifer Wayne (second place) and father/son team Dave and Connor O'Leary (first place). The Big Brother stars however did become the first team to complete an entire race course on two separate seasons.

=== Celebrity Fear Factor ===
Villegas and Reilly participated in the episode titled "Royalty Rumble." Villegas and his wife climbed through cockroaches, snakes, frogs, crabs and maggots to complete a puzzle. They were immersed in a giant water tank upside down by their ankles to test their fear of drowning and how long they could handle the task. Finally, they completed the stunt of landing a helicopter on a moving 18-wheeler, disarming a bomb, and escaping before the truck blew up. Villegas and Reilly had the quickest time and won $50,000 for lung cancer charity.

== Personal life ==
Villegas proposed to fellow Big Brother player Rachel Reilly on Valentine's Day 2011; they married on September 8, 2012. WE TV Network aired Reilly and Villegas's wedding as a holiday wedding special. Celebrity event coordinator David Tutera planned the gala, which took place at sunset in the city of Los Angeles. The wedding was attended by approximately 120 friends and family. The couple honeymooned in Aruba. On September 16, 2015, Reilly and Villegas announced that she was pregnant with their first child together. On April 8, 2016, their child was born, a girl named Adora Borealis Villegas. On May 10, 2020, Reilly and Villegas announced that she was pregnant with their second child together. On November 11, 2020, their child was born, a boy named Adler Mateo Villegas.

On July 1, 2023, Villegas joined the Department of Radiology at The University of Alabama at Birmingham as an Assistant Professor.

== Filmography ==
=== Television - as self ===
Year	Title	Role	Notes
2012	Natural Born Sellers	Guest	Episode: "Buying a House Versus Buying a Condo"
2012	My Fair Wedding with David Tutera	Guest	Episode: "Brenchel"
2022	Better with the Brenchels	Host	8 episodes Bspoke TV network; executive producer
2025	Big Brother: Unlocked	Guest	Companion show with Big Brother 27 (1 episode)

=== Television - as actor ===
Year	Title	Role	Notes
2010–2014	The Bold and the Beautiful	Bikini Beach Bartender / Bikini Beach Waiter	17 episodes

=== Reality Competition ===
Year	Title	Role	Notes
2010	Big Brother 12	Contestant	6th Place
2011	Big Brother 13	Contestant	9th Place
2012	The Amazing Race 20	Contestant	3rd Place
2014	The Amazing Race 24	Contestant	3rd Place
2018	Celebrity Fear Factor	Contestant	Winner
