= Tolombón =

- Municipality and village
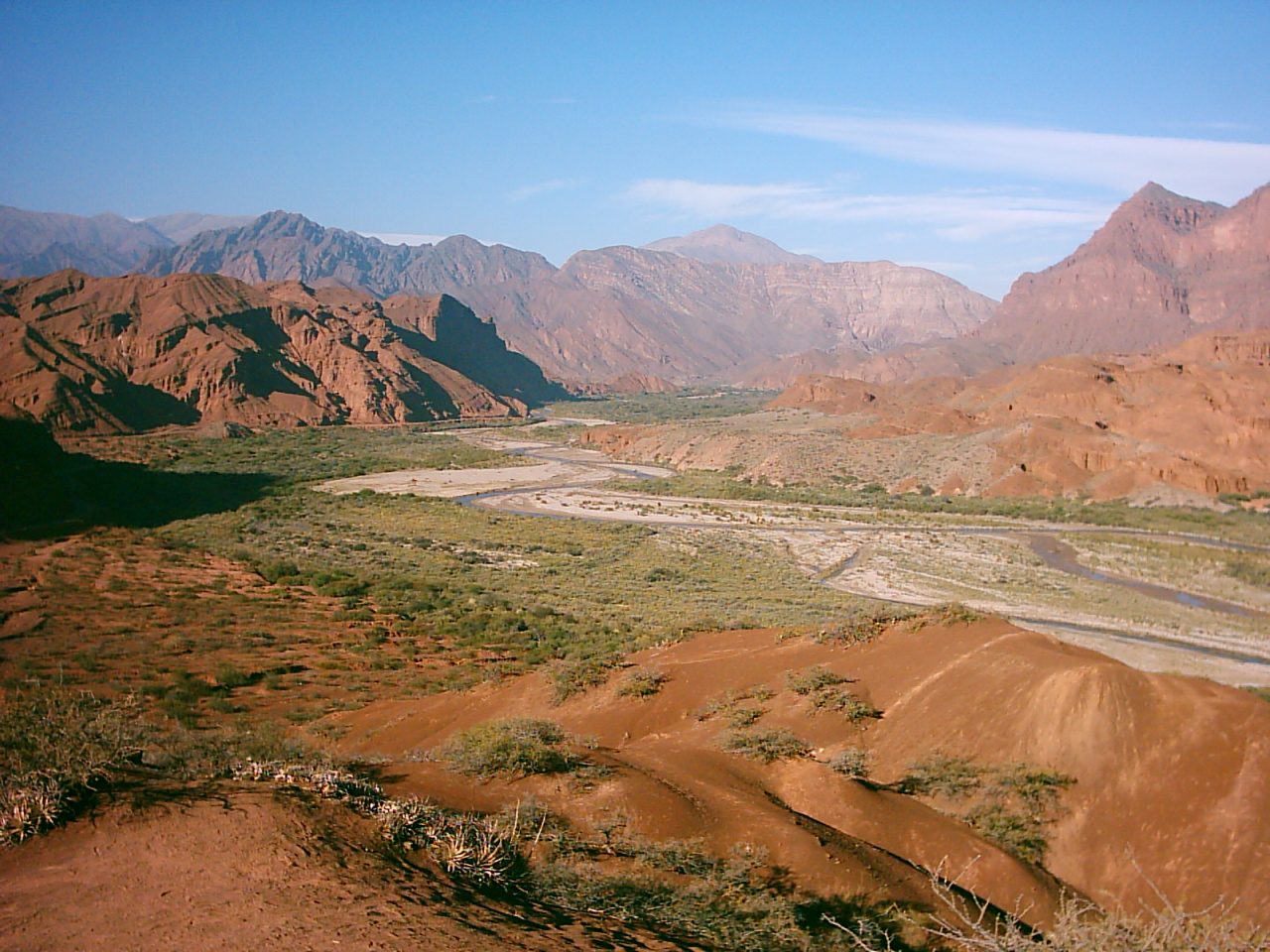

- Location within Argentina
- Coordinates: 26°12′S 65°55′W
- Country: Argentina
- Province: Salta Province
- Department: Cafayate Department

Population
  - Total: 255
- Time zone: UTC−3 (ART)

Tolombón is a village and rural municipality in Salta Province in northwestern Argentina. It is in the Cafayate department. It is 14 km south of Cafayate. Currently, only 255 people live there.

== History ==
It is unknown when this village was founded, but it is known that the Incas conquered it in 1480. Tolombón was invaded again in 1535, by the Conquistadors.
