= Cafayate Department =

Cafayate
- Department
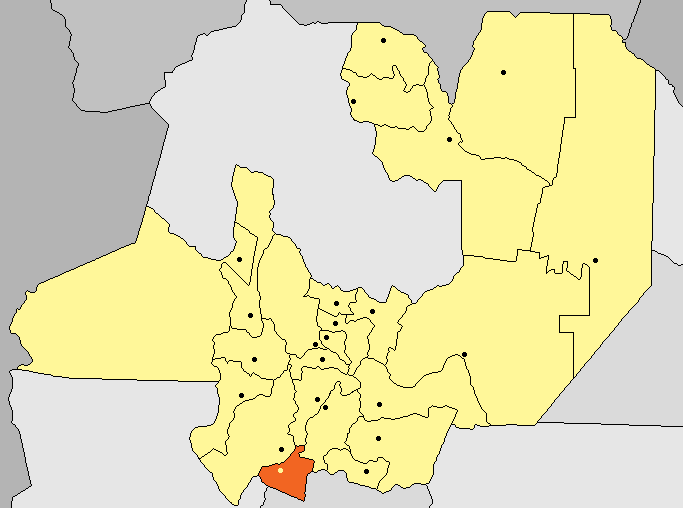
- Coordinates: 26°4′10″S 65°58′34″W
- Country: Argentina
- Province: Salta

Area
  - Total: 1,570 km^{2} (610 sq mi)

Population (2010)
  - Total: 11,785
  - Density: 7.51/km^{2} (19.4/sq mi)

Cafayate is a department located in Salta Province, in northwestern Argentina.

Situated in the south of the province and with an area of 1,570 km^{2} (606 sq mi) it borders the departments of San Carlos, La Viña, Guachipas and the provinces of Tucumán and Catamarca.

== Towns and municipalities ==
- Cafayate
- Tolombón
- Las Conchas
- Santa Bárbara

== Geography ==
The main rivers in the region are Calchaquí, and Santa María. Both end at the area called Las Juntas or La Ciénaga, joining at the beginning of the Las Conchas river, which runs in the same-named vallery to the northwest, ending at the Cabra Corral reservoir.

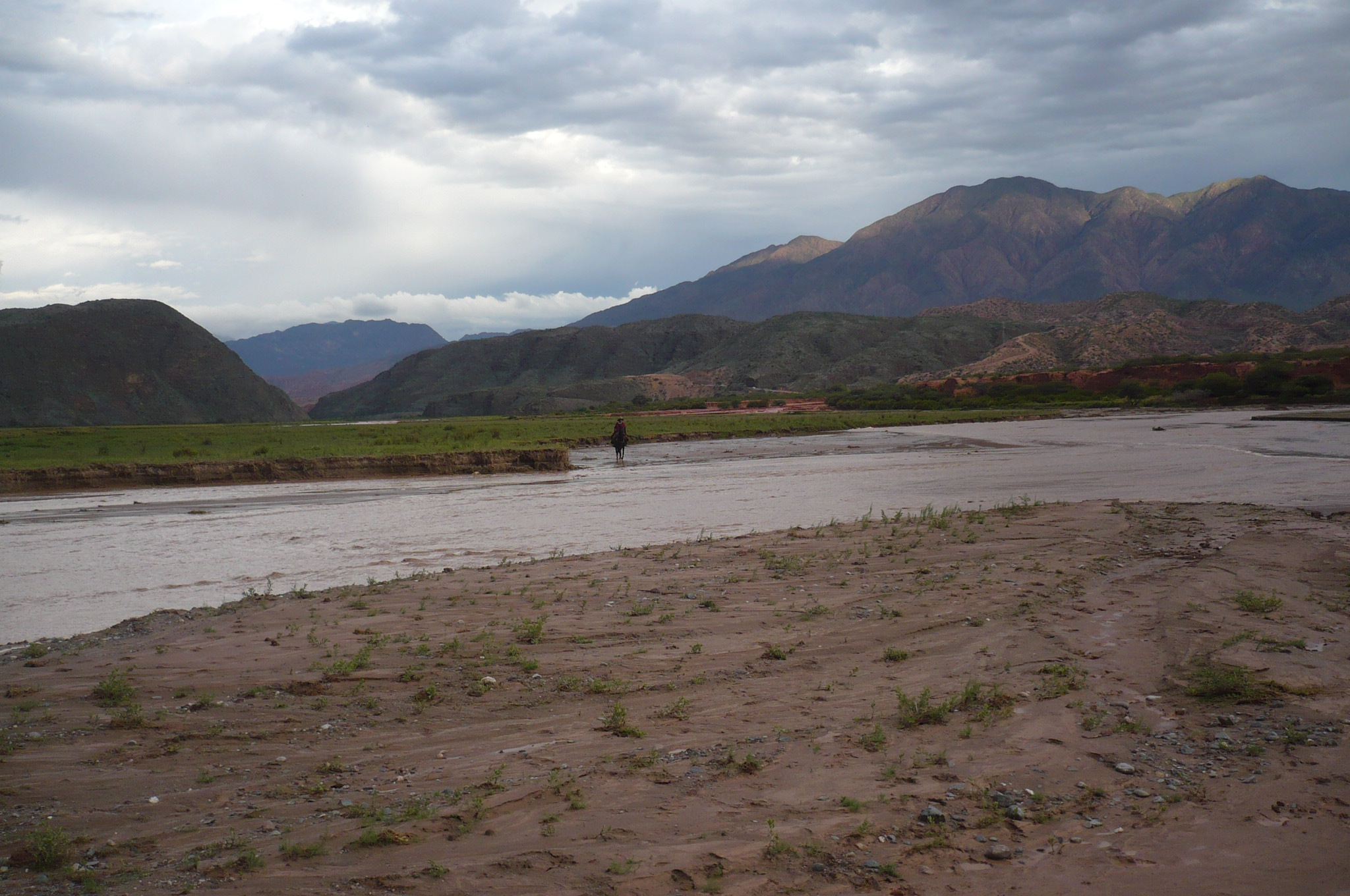
Las Juntas

== Tourism ==
The Department is known for its vineyards. Cafayate has other tourist sites such as an 18th-century mill built by the Jesuits which is still used on occasion for the tourism trade.
