= Traditional Hawaiian games =

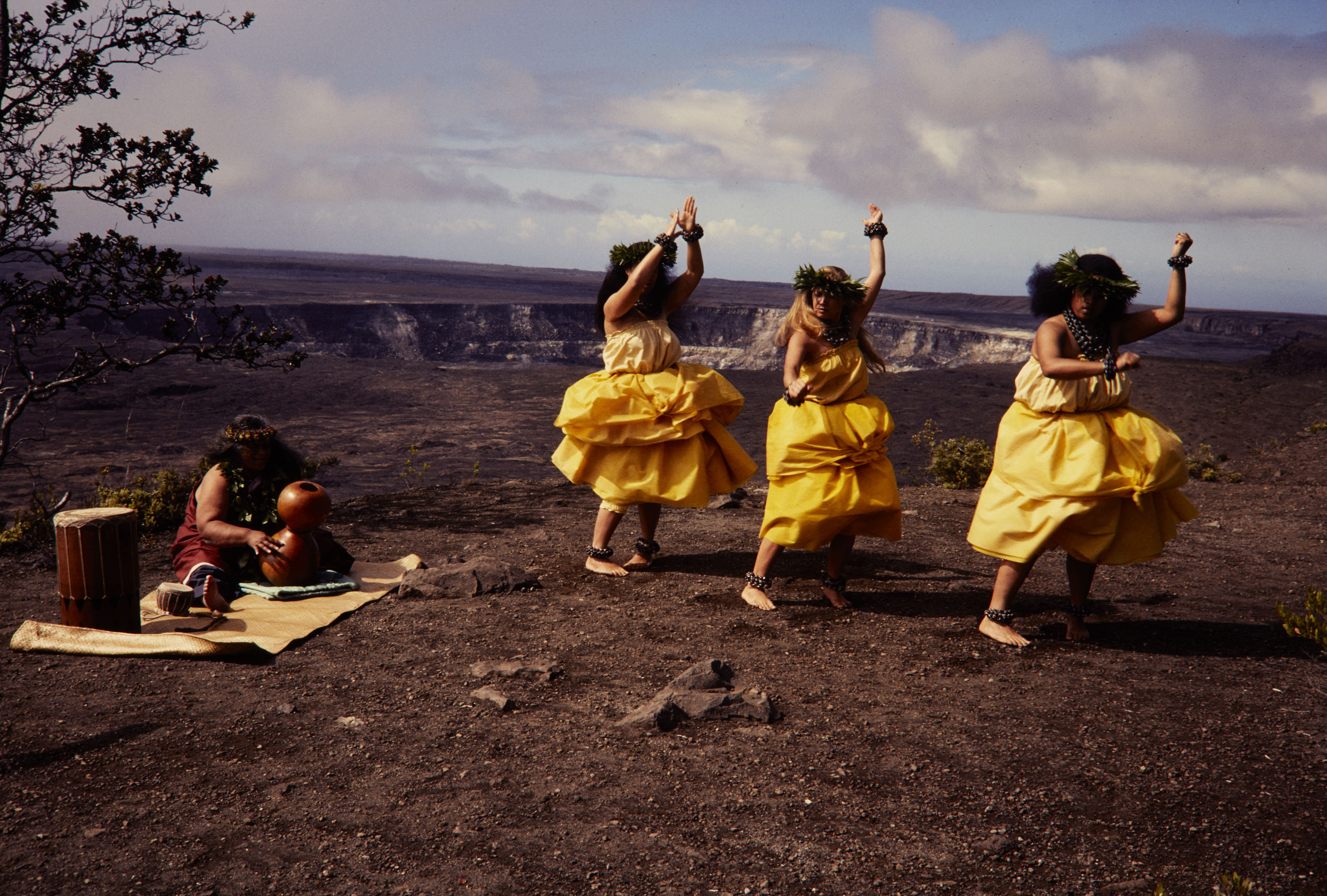
Native Hawaiians dancing at Hawaiʻi Volcanoes National Park.

Pāʻani Hawaiʻi (Hawaiian: Pāʻani Hawaiʻi, also anglicized as "Paani Hawaii") or Pāʻani for short, are Hawaiian play, games, and contests. Most pāʻani Hawaiʻi place pertinence on language and chanting as part of the pāʻani, excepting only lele koali (Hawaiian: kowali), a Hawaiian swinging game based around either a koali vine or a koali hao (metal chain). Manaleo “Aunty” Alice in her Ka Leo Hawaiʻi interview stated that an exchange of words and play spans either a few days or a whole week during lele koali. During this time, everybody gathers to socialize, tell stories, play music, and share meals. Pāʻani Hawaiʻi has been compared in anthropological study to Japanese games.

== History ==
=== Decline ===
Early 20th century scholars attach the decline of pāʻani kahiko (English: traditional games) to the decline in Hawaiian cultural practice. This is supported by evidence of Hawaiian people passing away at the turn of the century. In addition to a decline in the population of native Hawaiians, religious differences, which evolved between the early 19th and 20th centuries, may have contributed to the decline of traditional Hawaiian games. Some Hawaiians who were converting to Christianity struggled to maintain their cultural practices in the face of the new religion. The overthrow of Ka Lāhui Hawaiʻi Kūʻokoʻa, and the provisional government, which outlawed Hawaiian Language as a medium of education, also distracted from pāʻani. Many of the pāʻani, which were sometimes symbols of akua, or elements (gods and goddesses) were relegated to the background.

=== First resurgence ===
A renewal of pāʻani during the 1950s is attributed to a pageantry (play) held by the Honolulu Parks and Recreation Department in 1921. At the time, President Woodrow Wilson was visiting Hawaii. He saw the play and stated that there should be more investment in Pāʻani Hawaiʻi Kāhiko. This led to a larger investment in this “pageantry”, which was enacted competitively at the Kennedy Theatre in the University of Hawaiʻi at Mānoa.

=== Second resurgence ===
The next resurgence occurred during the establishment of ʻAha Pūnana Leo. The ʻAha Pūnana Leo, a system of networks based around ʻōlelo Hawaiʻi, (Hawaiian language) became a charter public school which enabled space for Hawaiian practices to be normal. In many Kaiapuni Schools, at least during the 1990s, students committed themselves to playing many pāʻani. Pala ʻIe, a game similar to the kendama, but was “a flexible stick made of braided coconut leaves with a loop at one end and a tapa ball on a string attached below the loop. The object was to catch the ball in the loop”. Peʻepeʻe akua, the Hawaiʻi equivalent of hide ‘n’ seek, was done to a chant for Pele, an akua Hawaiʻi. Lono, mauli, pau, (similar to rochambeau), but this pāʻani was meant to help players memorize moon phases. It was played along with Makahiki games that took place during ʻaha wehena (opening ceremonies).

Pāʻani Hawaiʻi related to Makahiki are therefore related to Lonoikamakahiki. The number of akua at play during pāʻani Hawaiʻi. Hawaiʻi believed there to be kini akua or more than four hundred thousand akua.

== Pāʻani Makahiki ==
Makahiki Games are the most commonplace in the islands. The time for these games to be played is marked by the rising of Makaliʻi (Pleiades) during the month of Welehu. ʻUlu maika is a game where the contestants bowl a rounded stone between two sticks. Mokomoko (aka kuʻikuʻi) is a boxing contest done with chants specific to the place. Hākōkō (wrestling), ʻŌʻō ʻIhe, spear throwing into a banana stump, Honuhonu, hand pulling, Keʻa Pua, dart throwing, (Pā) Uma, wrist wrestling, Pūhenehene, concealing stones, Kākālāʻau, spear fencing, Loulou, interlocked finger pulling and Kulakulaʻi, a pushing contest are played then

Some moʻolelo (stories) suggest that mokomoko is the opening pāʻani during makahiki, and requires blood to be drawn. During pāʻani Makahiki, the pāʻani champion of each ahupuaʻa is allowed to circle the island with an elite company of champions. During this island circuit, the akua pāʻani, an idol related to play, traverses the pāʻani and watches over participants, sometimes watching for a specific person, other times they watch over many. The akua pāʻani is typically held by a court, who collect the ancestral taxes from each ahupuaʻa, alongside an aliʻi (a chief or chiefess) and a moʻī (paramount chief or chiefess). This is an exceptional act though; it is not often that makaʻainana or citizens are allowed to interact with their aliʻi in this manner.

== Kekahi Leʻaleʻa ==
Some pāʻani are for the purpose of leʻaleʻa and hoʻoipoipo. These are perhaps the most intricate of the games: Kilu is a pāʻani of courting that relies on hula, mele, and is specific for aliʻi, which also suggests a need for establishing genealogy. ʻUme is a pāʻani similar to Kilu. It is for the commoners and was called ʻume because the participants would be drawn to each other. Pūhene is a game of concealing a rock on the body of a person, the specific instance of Hiʻiaka's experiences with Kilu, and Pūhenehene may reveal to the players the intricacy of language and movement necessary for these pāʻani.

== Other Pāʻani ==
Many other pāʻani exist in Hawaiʻi. Language tends to be their biggest feature. Games such as hoʻolele kī, are specific to one place (Kīlauea). Various others take place only in certain regions, such as kaupua, a race done in the ocean, or keʻa pua, which requires a sugar cane stock and sugar cane flower, a dirt mound, and rope. One of the most well known games, kōnane, is a game of wits that requires ʻiliʻili from the ocean region and pōhaku (rocks) from either the plains or mountain regions. It is possible to read English interpretations of these pāʻani and how to participate in them in books such as Donald D. Kilolani Mitchell's books Resource Units in Hawaiian Culture Hawaiian games for today, and Pukui's Hawaiian Dictionary.
