= Ulu maika =

Traditional pre-contact Hawaiian game

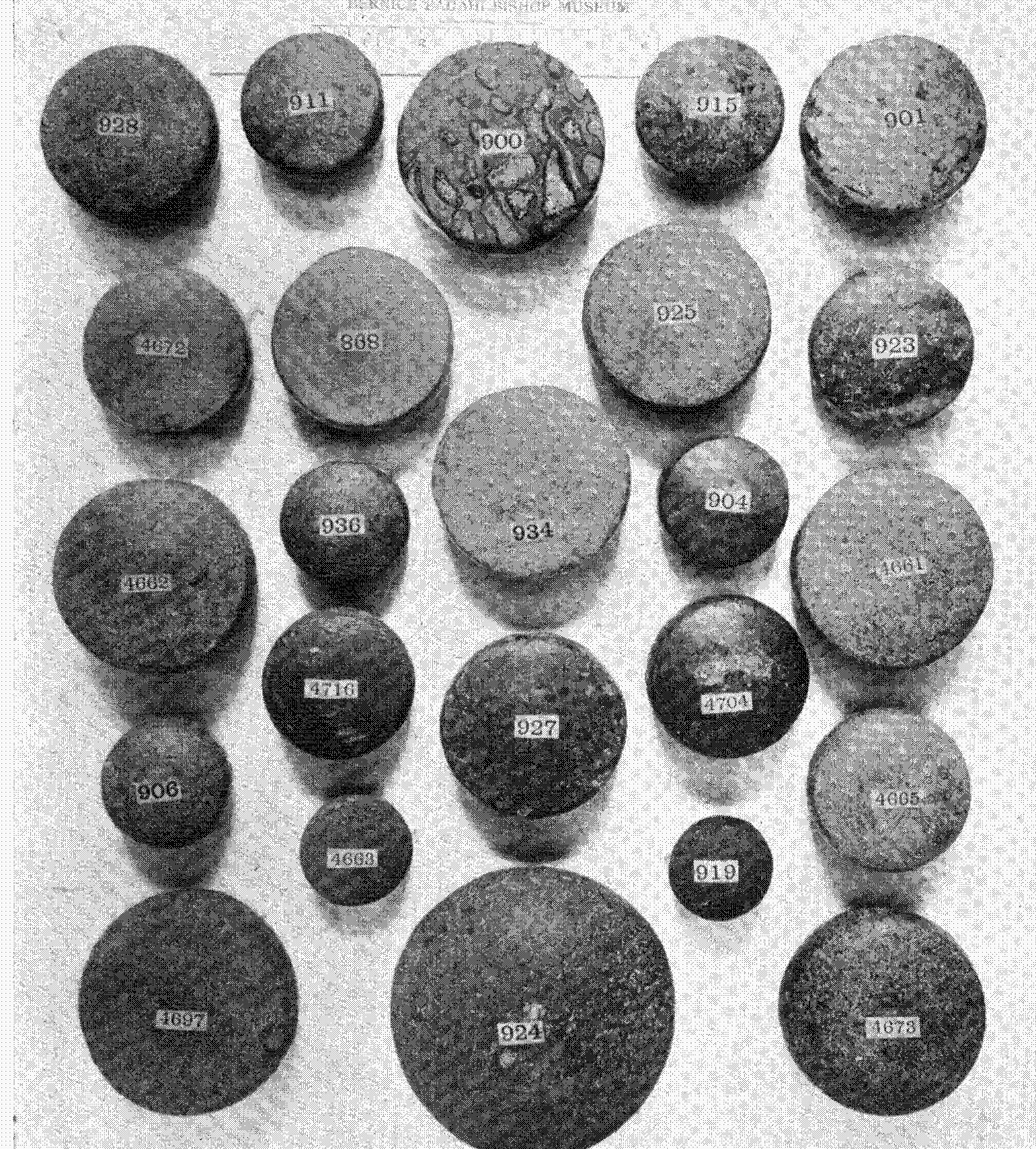
Maika stones on display at the Bernice Pauahi Bishop Museum

Ulu maika is a type of traditional pre-contact Hawaiian game (Pāʻani Hawaiʻi). It has been described as being similar to the modern sport of bowling.

The game is played with multiple people who would underhandedly roll a disc shaped stone called a Maika, which was usually made from volcanic rock. The objective of the game was to roll your Maika further than your opponent's Maika. According to the National Museum of Australia, Ulu maika was traditionally played exclusively by men. According to the Linden Museum, Ulu maika was traditionally played by both adults and children.

== Versions of Ulu maika ==
Ulu maika is sometimes played on a flat field, but some versions include a specially prepared path called a kahuamaika.

In some versions of Ulu maika the players roll the maika with their hands while in others the players used sticks to propel the stones.
