= Santa Bárbara, Salta =

Coordinates: 25°55′41″S 65°43′08″W

Santa Bárbara (Salta)
- Municipality and village
- Interactive map of Santa Bárbara (Salta)
- Country: Argentina
- Province: Salta Province
- Time zone: UTC−3 (ART)

Santa Bárbara (Salta) is a village and rural municipality in Cafayate Department located in Salta Province in northwestern Argentina.
