= Plaza Intendente Alvear =

Square in Buenos Aires, Argentina

Coordinates: 34.5858°S 58.3909°W

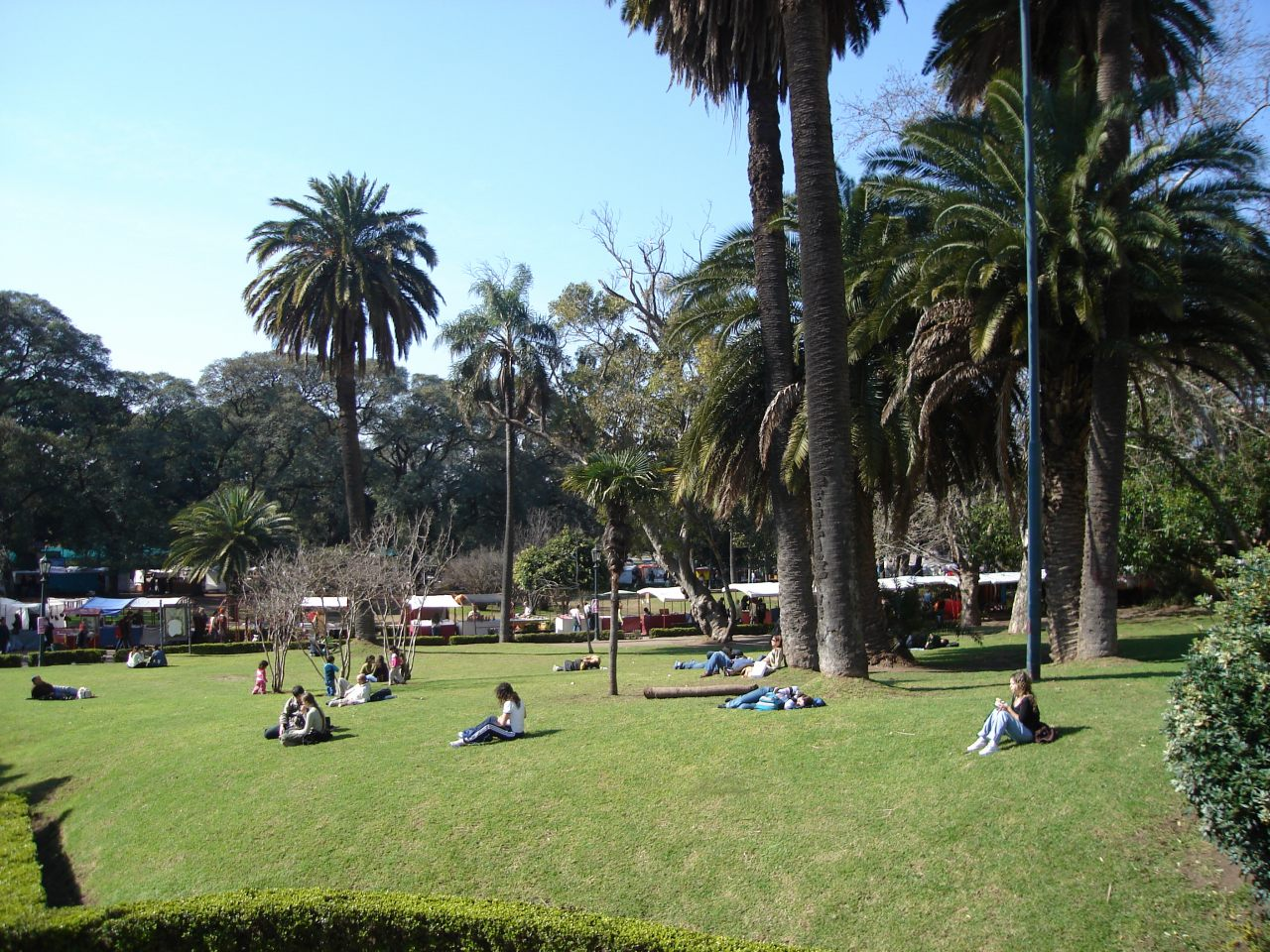
Vista general del sector norte de la Plaza Intendente Alvear

Plaza Intendente Alvear is a public space in Recoleta, Buenos Aires. It is commonly but mistakenly known as Plaza Francia, as the actual Plaza Francia is located at its side. It faces the Recoleta Cemetery and the cultural center.

== History ==
The plaza gained fame in the 1960s for its vibrant street fair. Over the years, the fair has evolved to include not only authentic artisans and craftspeople but also a diverse array of street vendors and merchants offering a broad range of goods.

== Modern use ==
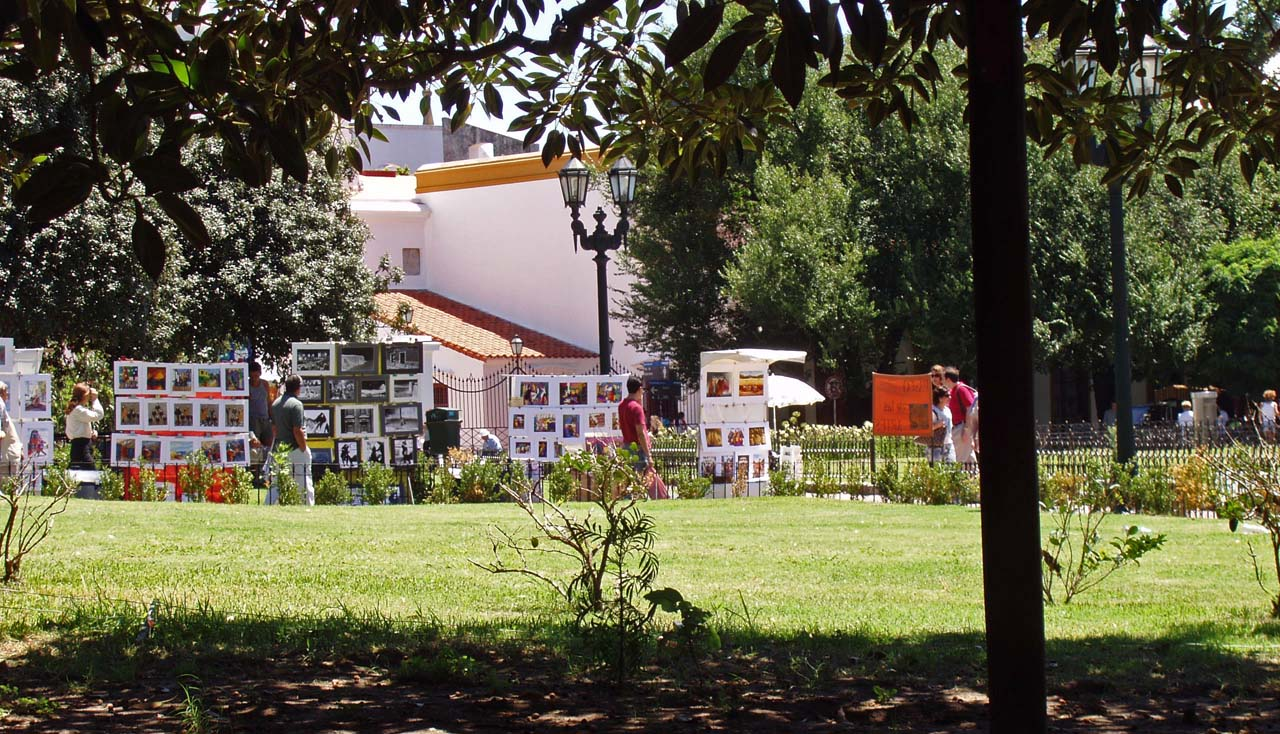
Artisan's Fair

At present, the Government of the City of Buenos Aires has reorganized the fair, encouraging the participation of those artisans whose work is original and authentic and discouraging those whose merchandise is of low quality or those who simply sell mass-produced items. The artisans, led by the organization, Interferias, must pass an evaluation process and be registered. Visitors to the fair may find a variety of handicraft items, many of them of high quality: leather goods, book restoration, sandals and espadrilles, carved mates, ethnic jewelry, incense, essential oils, spices, satchels, candles, indigenous musical instruments, photography, etc.

== Gallery ==
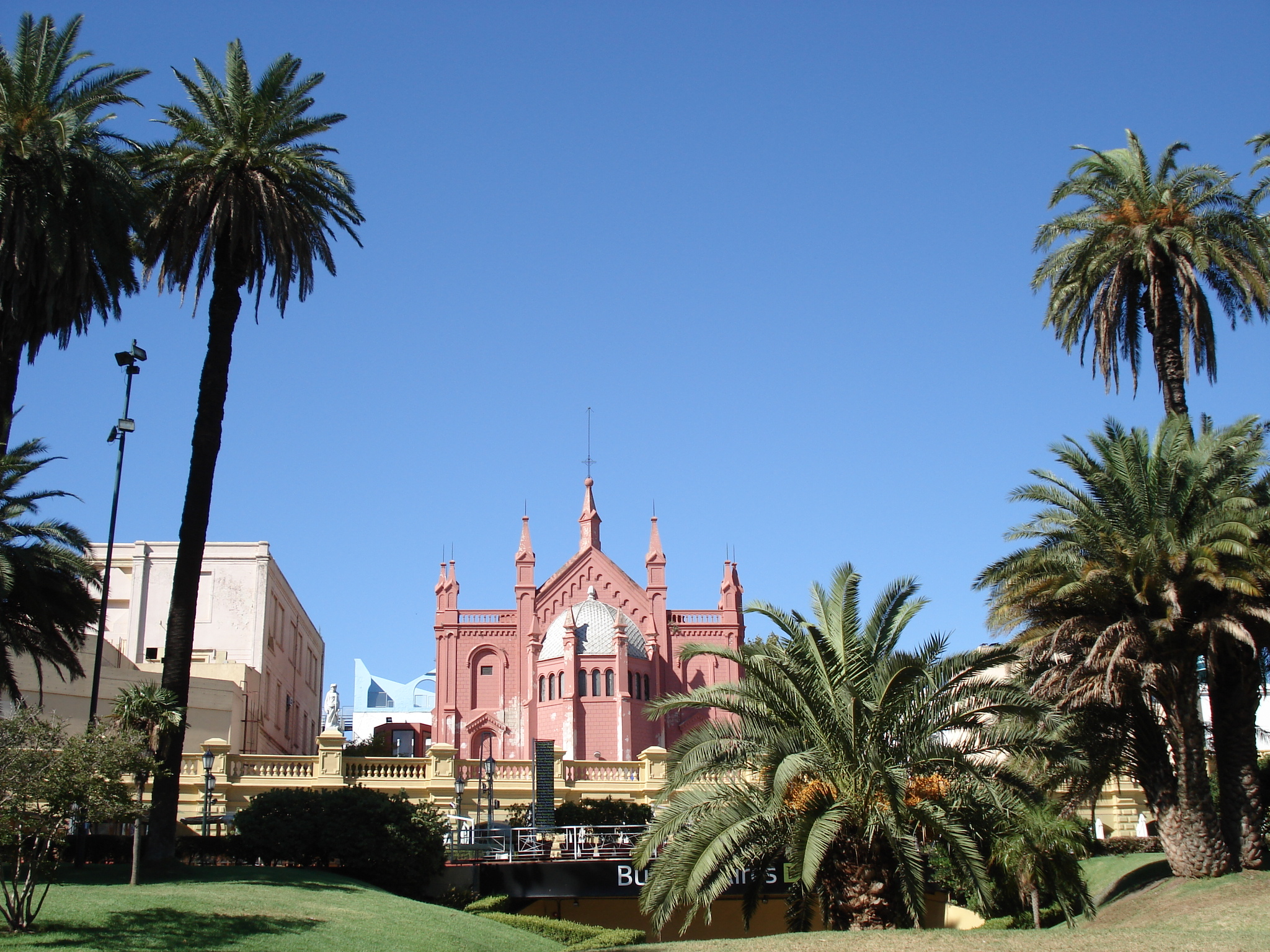

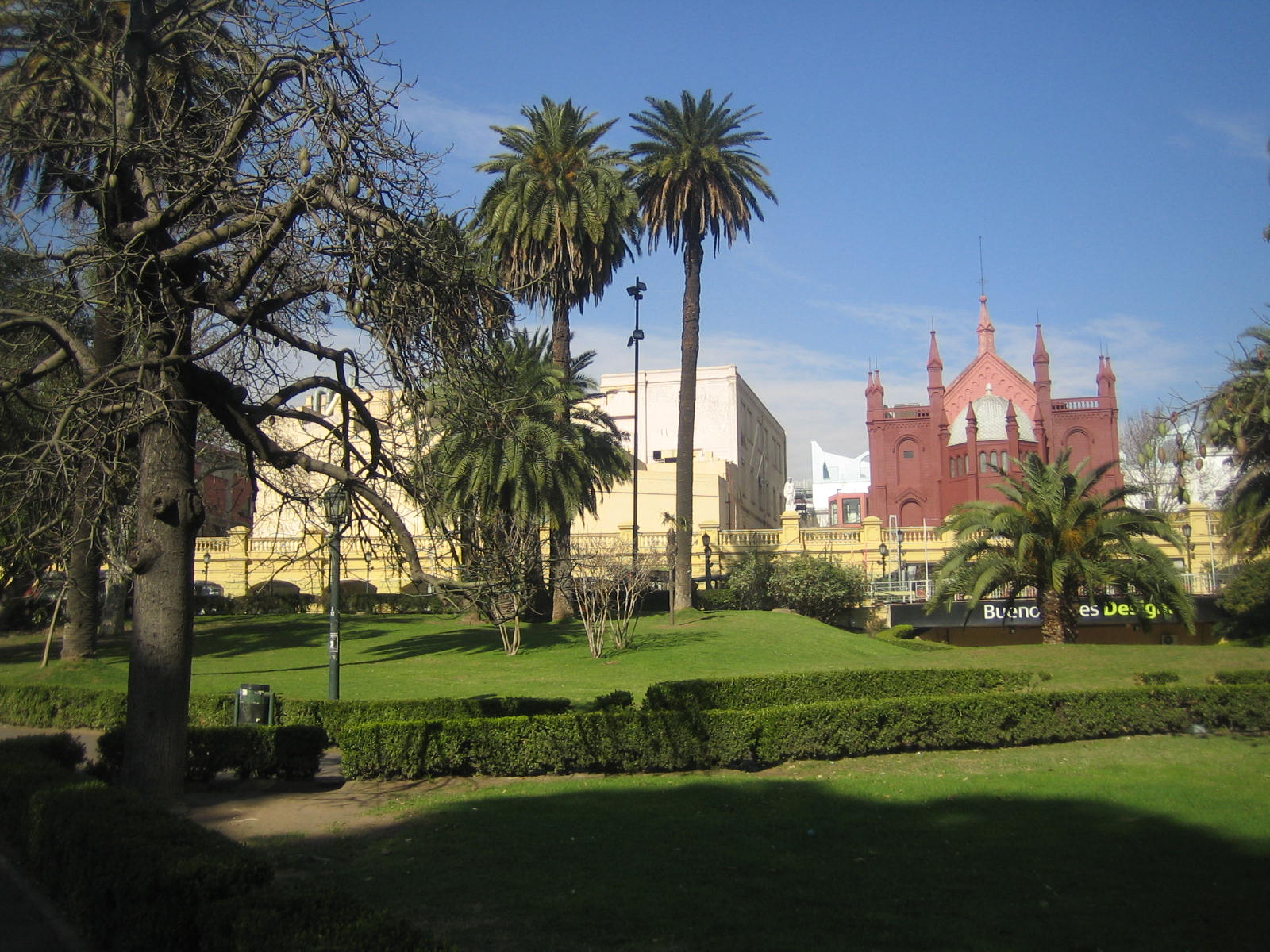

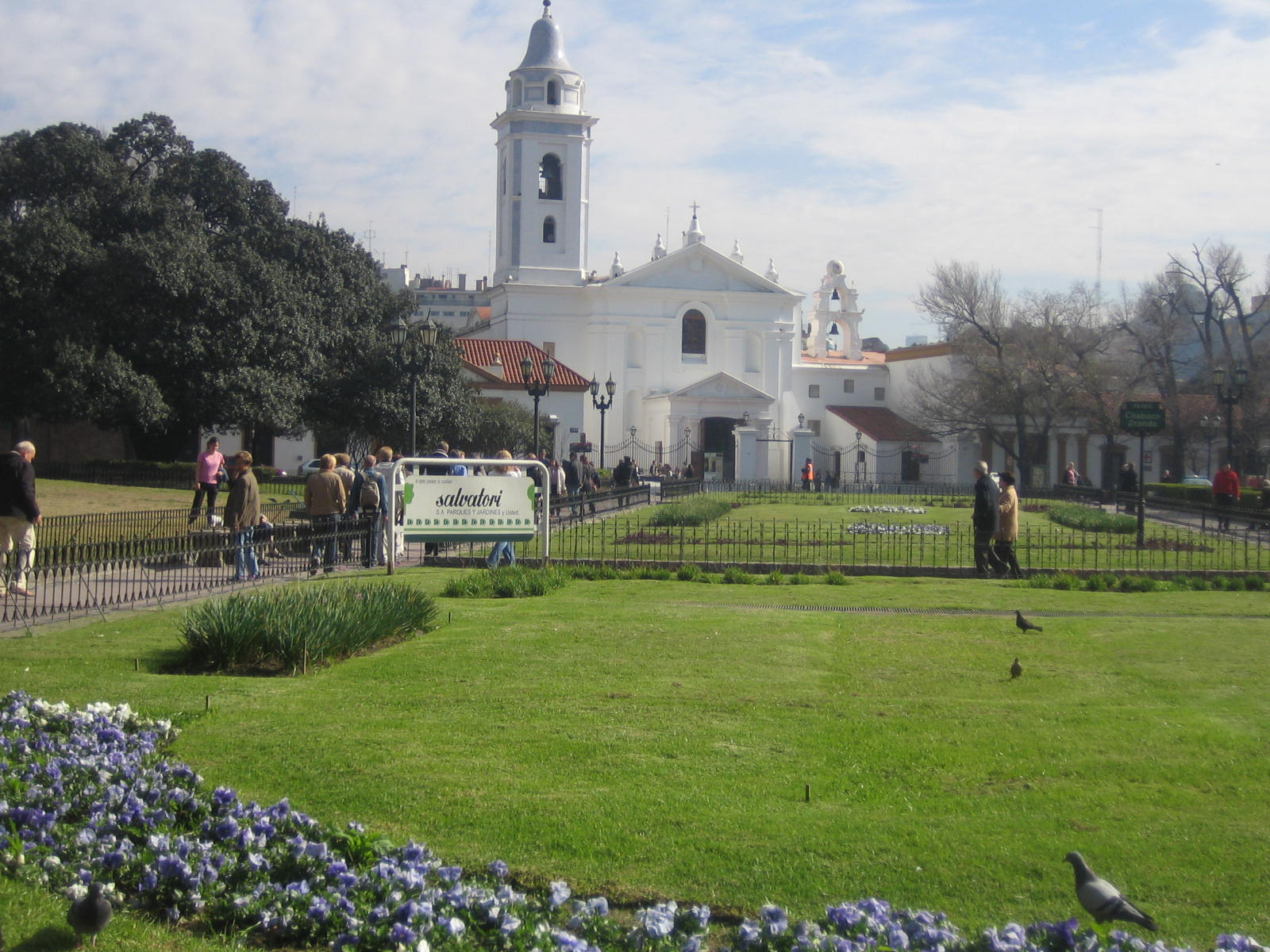

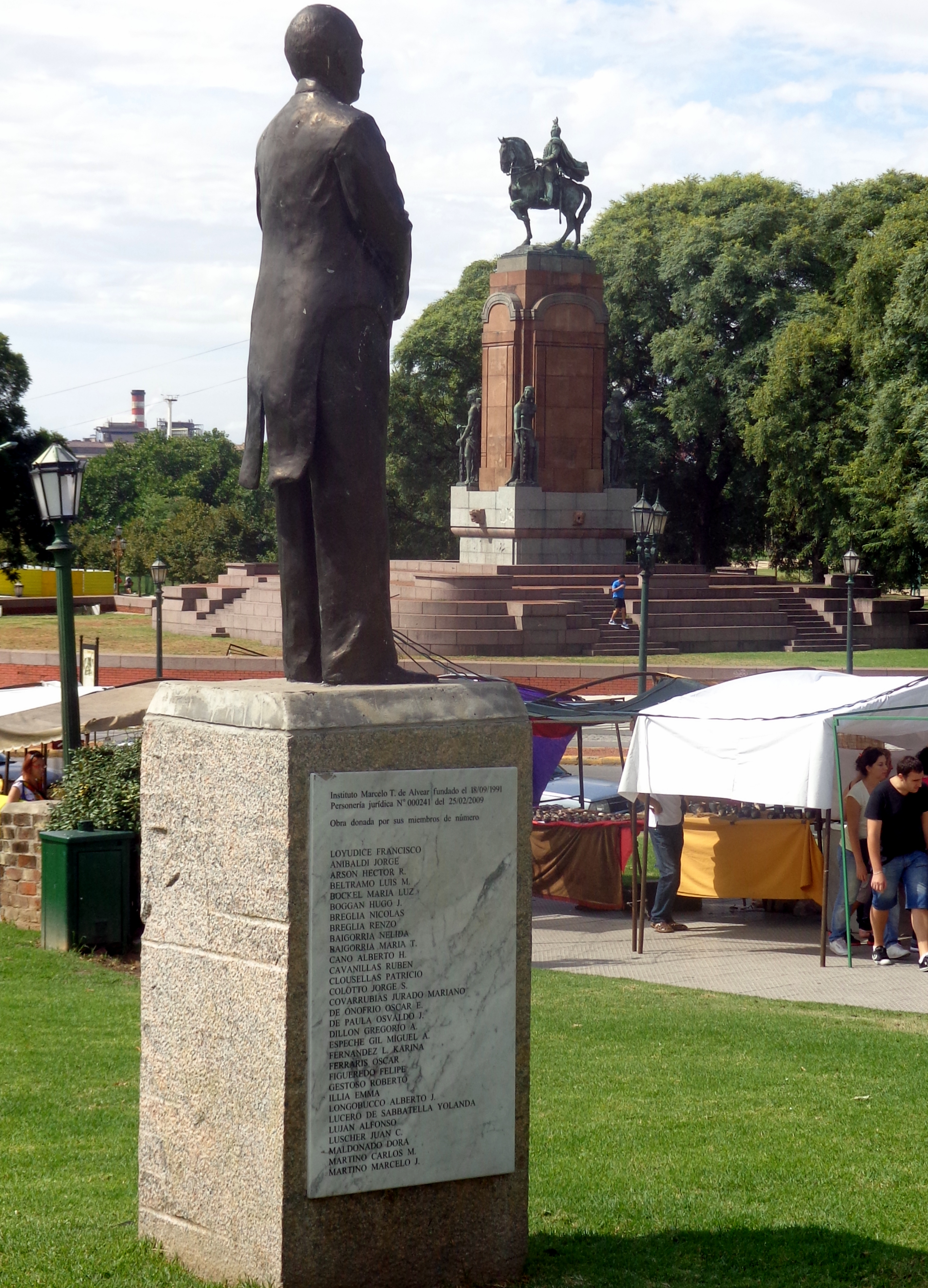
