= Quebrada de Las Flechas =

Coordinates: 25.699°S 66.130°W

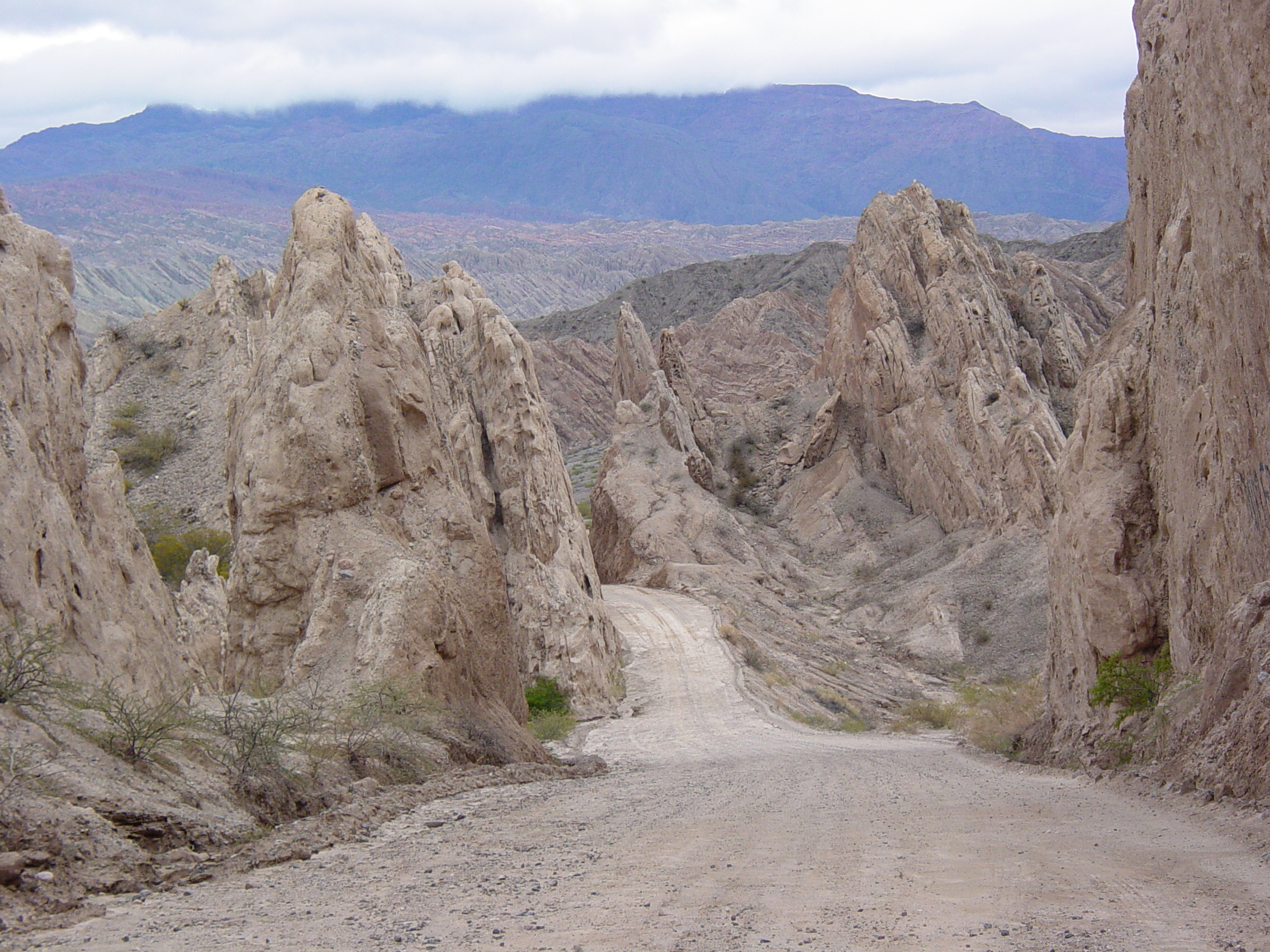
Quebrada de Las Flechas, National Route 40 (Argentina).

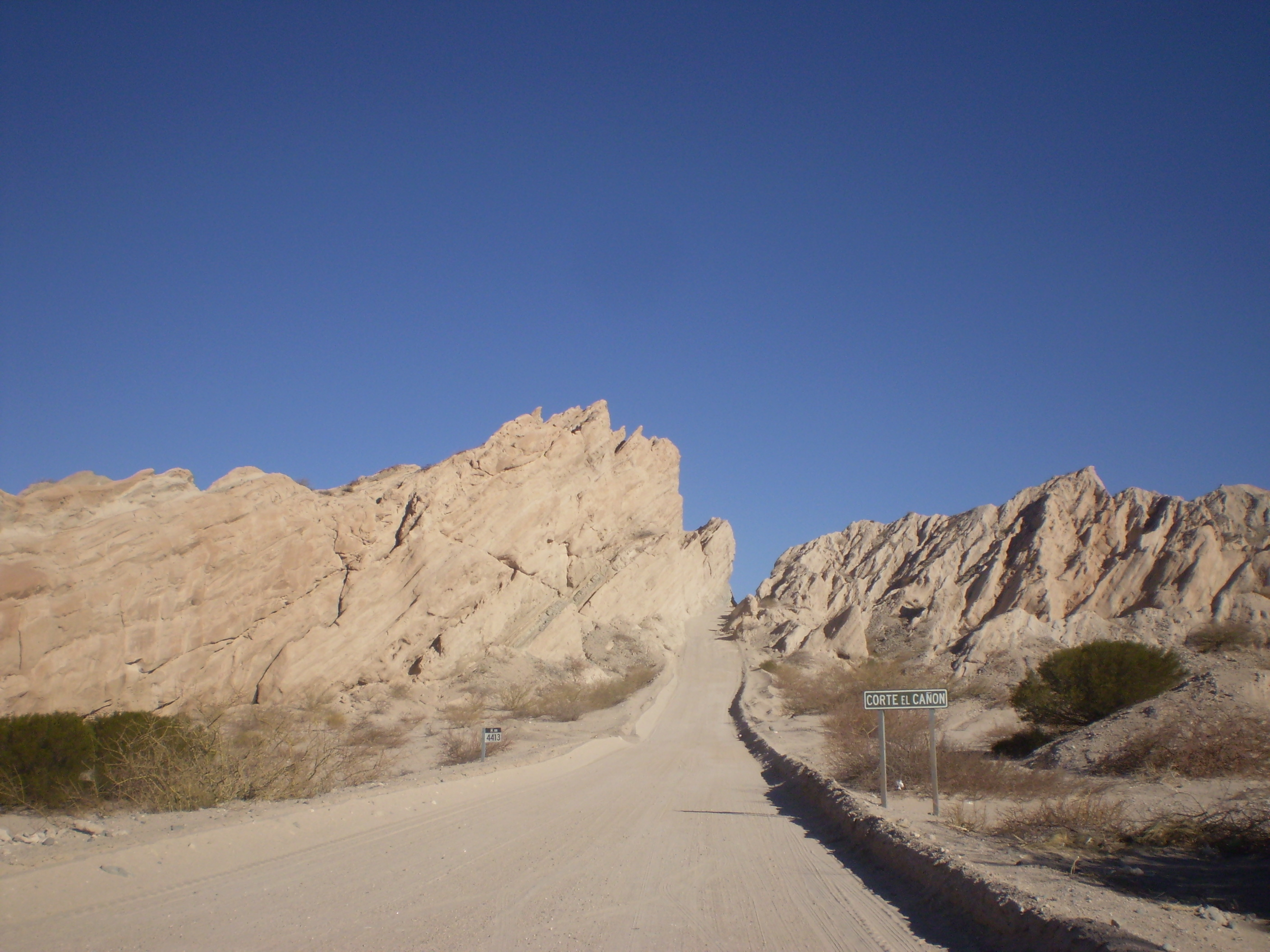
Corte El Cañón – Quebrada de Las Flechas, Salta Province.

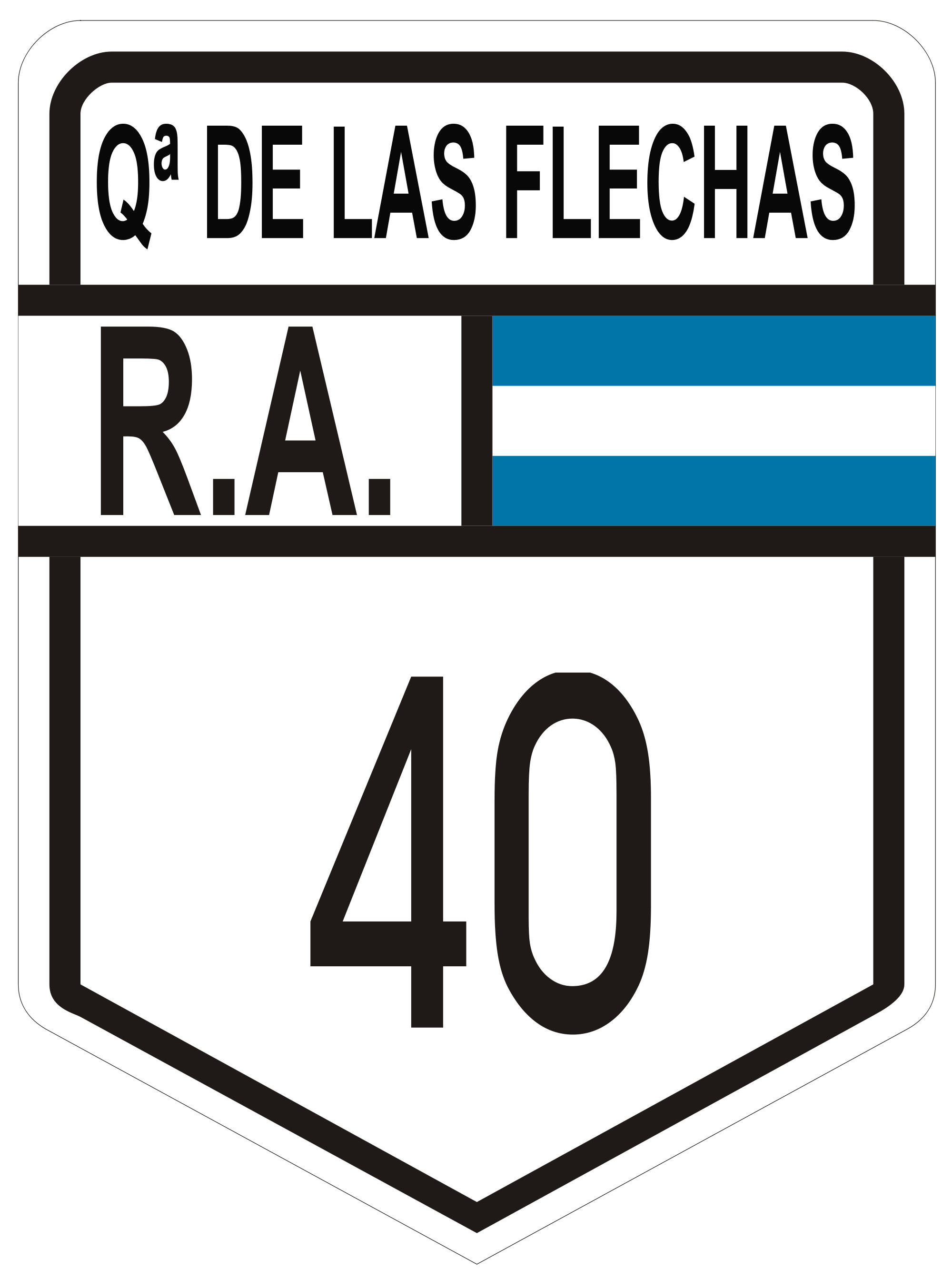
It is part of the tourist circuit of National Route 40.

The Quebrada de Las Flechas is a geographical feature (specifically a ravine) located at 4,380 kilometres (2,720 mi) of National Route 40 (the section that connects the towns of Cafayate and Cachi) in the San Carlos Department of the province of Salta, in the north of the Argentine Republic, extending for 20 kilometres (12 mi) within the Calchaquí Valleys, from Angastaco to the Calchaquí River. In 1995, the Salta Legislature incorporated it as one of its symbols.

Approximately 260 kilometres (160 mi) from the city of Salta (via Cafayate), these are inclined pointed rock formations that form narrow gorges with 20 metres (66 ft) high walls, making them one of the most attractive tourist spots on National Route 40.

While crossing the formations, the "Paso del Ventisquero" and especially the "Paso de la Flecha" stand out, which resembles a petrified glacier with sharp points, which was declared a natural monument of Angastaco by means of provincial law no. 6808 sanctioned on November 9, 1995.

Along the route, located at 4,420 kilometres (2,750 mi) of Route 40, is the oldest Jesuit church in the entire Calchaquí Valley, dating back to 1780. It was restored in 1969 by the current owners of the place (Finca El Carmen); made of adobe and a cane roof, with two colourful altars, the church seems to hang from a ravine, looking out over the valley in all its extension. From the place, and crossing the river, one can enter among ancient rocks where the archaeological remains such as funerary urns and vessels from the Santamariana culture (or Santa María culture), which inhabited these lands before the arrival of the Spanish.

The ravine is included in a large region included among the important areas for bird conservation in Argentina.

== Transitability ==
This 150 kilometres (93 mi) stretch of National Route 40 that connects the towns of Cafayate and Cachi can be travelled without any difficulty with any type of vehicle. The consolidated gravel road is in good condition and is permanently preserved, and is laid out between these angular formations where the earth points to the sky. At a moderate speed for the gravel road it takes approximately 5 hours to complete it. From Cafayate until passing the Quebrada de las Flechas the road is very bumpy and it is not advisable to exceed 20/25 km/h (0.50 mph). It is advisable to travel this section so as not to travel on it at night.

The narrow road begins to open up if one goes towards Angastaco and the opposite will happen if one travels north–south, since the town is the gateway to the Quebrada.

The colours of the formations change throughout the day depending on the position of the sun. They are bright in the morning and ochre in the afternoon, so it is always recommended to travel through them before sunset, although there are also those who dare to cross them on horseback under the light of the full moon, not by road but by the Calchaquí River ravine.

Although many cyclists undertake this journey in the summer, it is advisable not to do it in the full midday sun due to the high temperatures, the wide thermal amplitude and the stony and dusty terrain, which becomes more difficult in summer during the rainy season.

== Geological formation ==
Its origin dates back to between 15 and 20 million years ago when large blocks of rock began to rise on the edge of the Puna (hard, crystalline rocks originating in the Precambrian); Deep faults in the earth's crust raised granitic and metamorphic rocks forming a mountainous buttress. The sedimentary plates (reddish-brown sandstones that sedimented before the Andes existed) that were once found at ground level were broken by the rise of the mountains and their ends were tilted pointing towards the sky, creating narrow gorges with walls approximately 20 metres (66 ft) high. Later, erosion sharpened them and now they resemble blades or arrowheads one next to the other.

These strata were folded and fractured by the pressure of the Andean orogeny; over time, these materials became rocks that were classified under the name of Angastaco Formation, as this is where they reach their best expression.

Within the Angastaco Formation three sections are distinguished. The lower section is predominantly sandy, grey and light reddish brown in colour, the middle section is sandy, with coarse sandstones and grey conglomerates, and the upper section is essentially sandy with subordinate pelites.

== Nearby tourist sites ==
- Seclantás
- Colomé
- Molinos
- Animaná
- San Carlos
- Angastaco
- Pucará de Angastaco

== See also ==
- es:Quebrada de las Conchas
- Cafayate

== Gallery ==
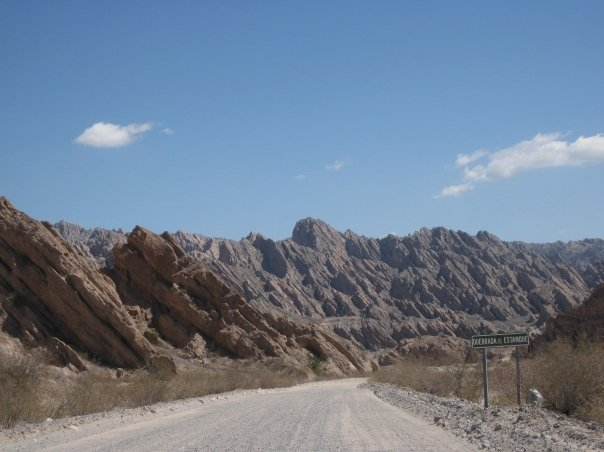
Consolidated road that crosses the ravine

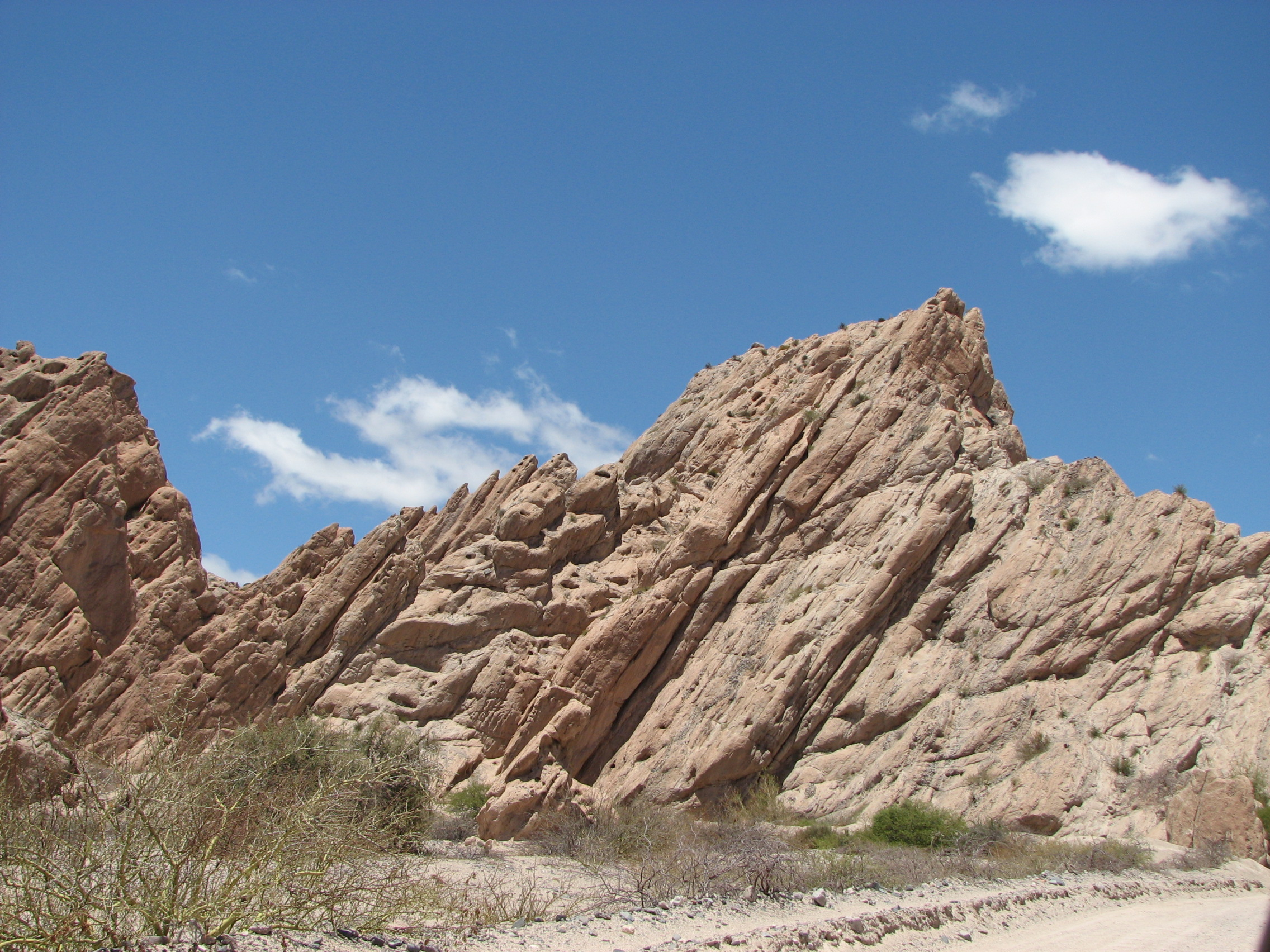
Arrows of the Ravine

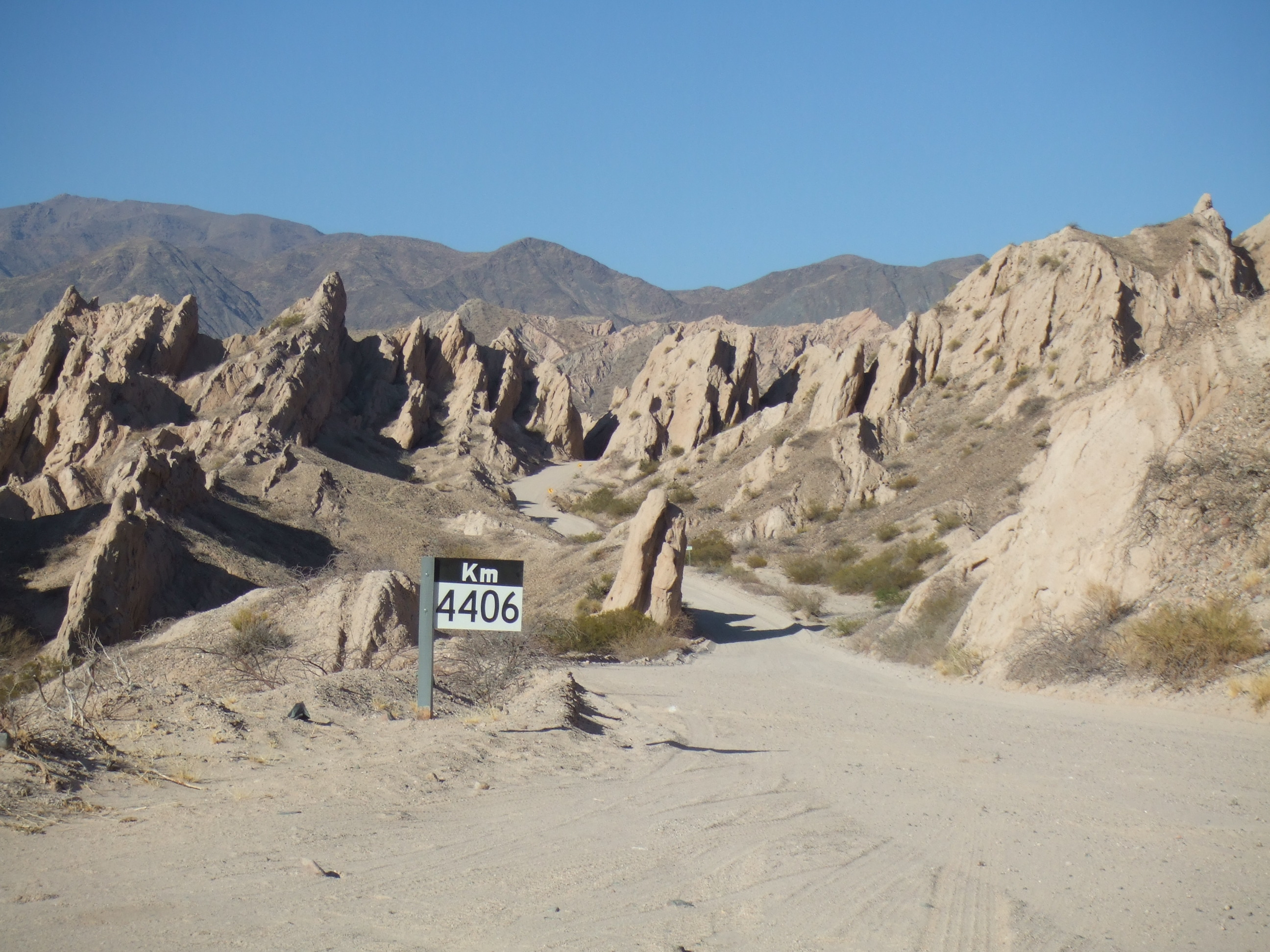
Ravine
