= Animaná =

- Municipality and village
- Location within Argentina
- Coordinates: 25°59′S 65°58′W
- Country: Argentina
- Province: Salta
- Department: San Carlos

Government
  - Municipal Commission President: Ignacio Vicente Cóndori

Area
  - Total: 344 km^{2} (133 sq mi)
- Elevation: 1,616 m (5,302 ft)

Population (2001)
  - Total: 1,454
- Time zone: UTC−3 (ART)
- Postal code: A4427
- Area code: 03868
- Climate: BWk

Animaná is a town and rural municipality in Salta Province in northwestern Argentina. At the 2001 census, the town had 1454 residents. Animaná means "sky place" in the Cacán language.

Animaná is located on National Route 40 south of San Carlos towards Cafayate. It is located 12 kilometres (7.5 mi) from Cafayate, and 200 kilometres (120 mi) from Salta by way of Cafayate. It is set in a picturesque area of Calchaquí Valley where there are many vineyards. Animaná has an arid climate and is located at 1,695 metres (5,561 ft) above sea level.

The local economy is dominated by the wine industry, with many vineyards and wineries located nearby. Animaná is also known for its weaving and its pottery.

The town's fiesta patronal, honoring the Virgin of Mercy, is celebrated September 24.
