= Angastaco =

Coordinates: 25°38′S 66°11′W

- Town
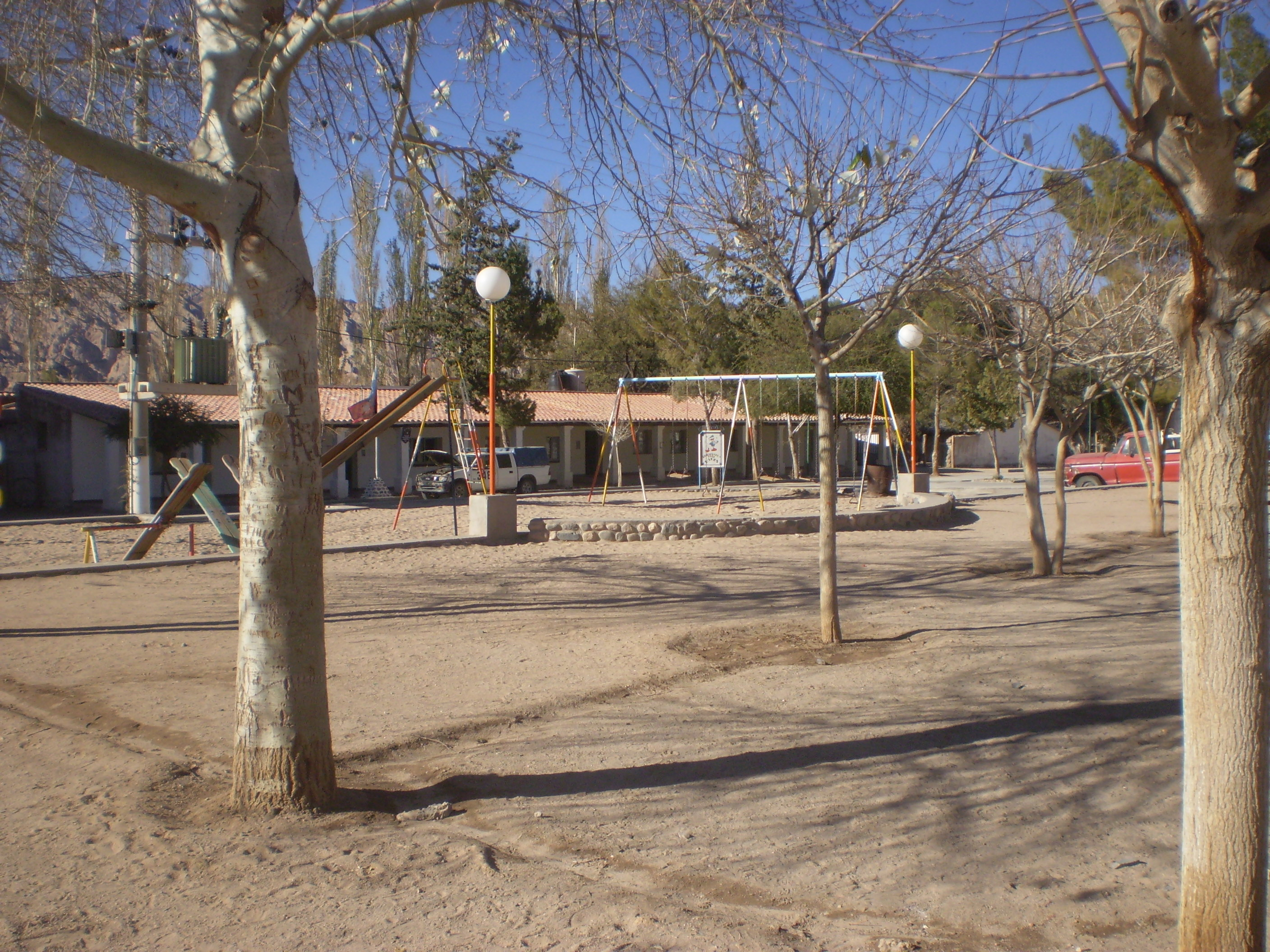
- View of main square
- Interactive map of Angastaco
- Country: Argentina
- Province: Salta
- Department: San Carlos
- Elevation: 1,990 m (6,530 ft)

Population (2001)
  - Total: 881
- Time zone: UTC−3 (ART)
- Climate: BWk

Angastaco is a town in San Carlos Department, Salta Province, Argentina, in the Calchaquí Valley. It is located on highway RN 40. In its original language, the town name means "Eagle of the Carob tree" (águila del algarrobo).

== Population ==
The town has 881 inhabitants 2001 census [INDEC], representing an increase of 40.3% compared to the 628 inhabitants 1991 census [INDEC] in the previous census.

== Tourism ==
Angastaco is located in the middle mountains in a valley, crossed by the river of the same name, which crosses near the village after its source in Pucara, pouring its waters into the river below Calchaquí. This is striking, the contrast between the lush green crops and the sandy soil of the valleys. Since the mid-eighteenth century, indigenous nations settled in the town of Angastaco depended on the Franciscan Mission of Calchaquí Rosario, located in the hamlet of San Isidro, near Cafayate.

== Places to visit ==
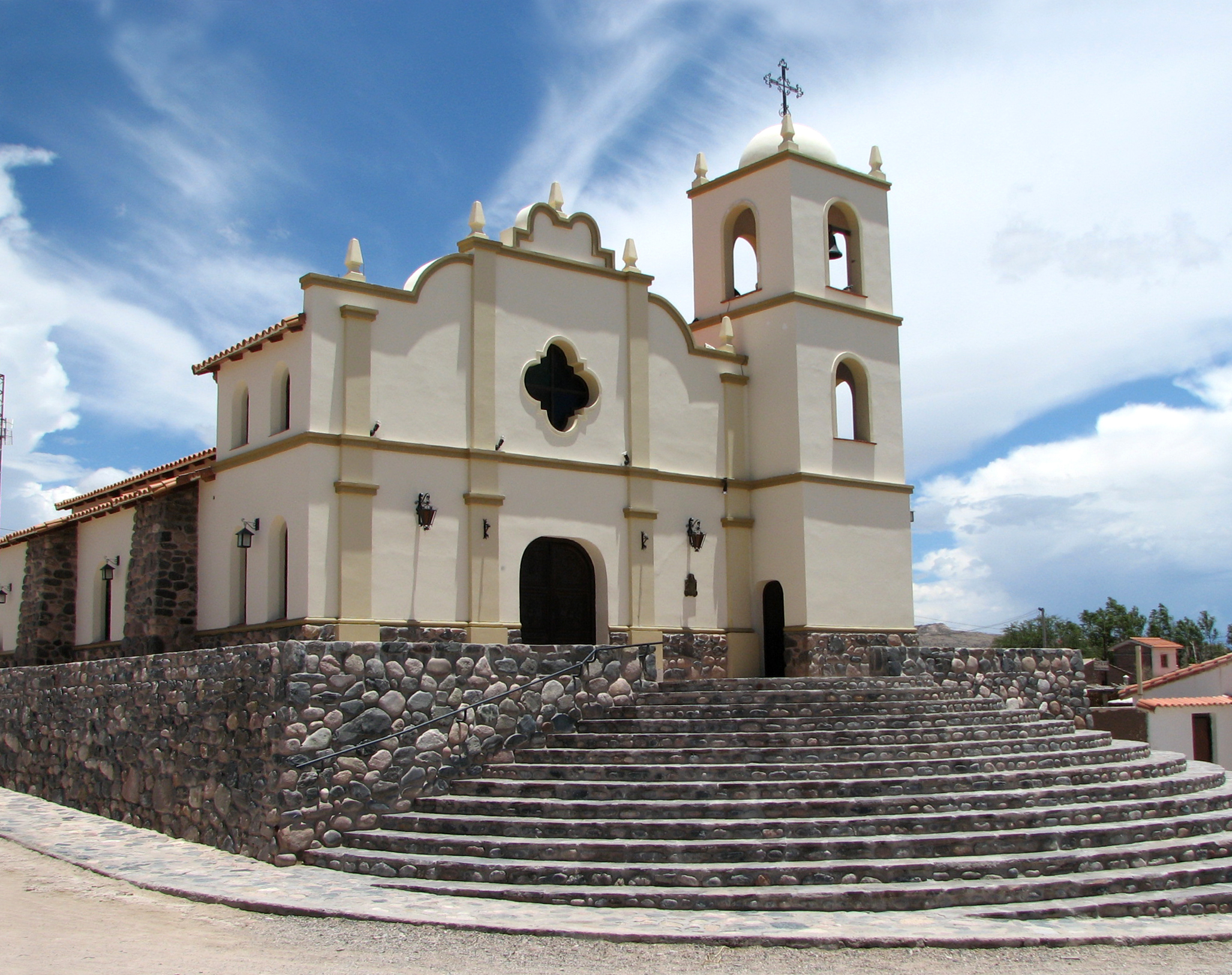
The main church

The town itself has a beautiful Inn, with a Civic Center with a small archaeological museum, with the Church that is projected onto a corner square with their crafts, with their regional wines and "Pater", with its incomparable perfume mistela.

Nearby in the direction of Cafayate, the landscape resembles that of the moon, especially in the Steps of the "Glacier" and "Arrow", the conditions and light constantly changing.

Finca El Carmen, rural residence, 8 km (5 mi) away in a northerly direction along the road to Cachi National Route 40, a fertile valley nestled between the mountains and continues with the particular characteristics of the stream of arrows. They develop farming and rural tourism, such as accommodation, excursions to heritage places, hot springs, and horseback riding among others. On the farm is located one of the oldest churches throughout the Valley Calchaquí dating from 1780, restored back in 1969 by the current owners. It is worth visiting this place both for the incredible scenery as well as by its customs and its people who are famous for their frog-dancing affinities.

== New church ==
The colonial architectural style temple was built by the Municipality of Angastaco between the years 1976–1979. The architect of this building was the William Lee. The church was opened on 8 December 1979 by Monsignor Diego Gutierrez Pedraza, Bishop of the Prelature of Cafayate.

== Old church ==
This temple dating from 1945 was built in the neighborhood of the place of the area materials: bricks, roof of bamboo and brick floor, on the campus of the Family Cross. It is housed in the "Old Village" adobe house, with streets that are no longer dirt and stone leaving behind part of the history of the town.

== Slogan of the people and poetry ==
"Green sand and wine ..." Walker who comes to this gritty town, allows you ofresca Angastaco their friendship, their fortunes and their wine that will drink happy while you step on the white heart of the Moon ...

— Manuel J. Castilla

== Los Colorados ==
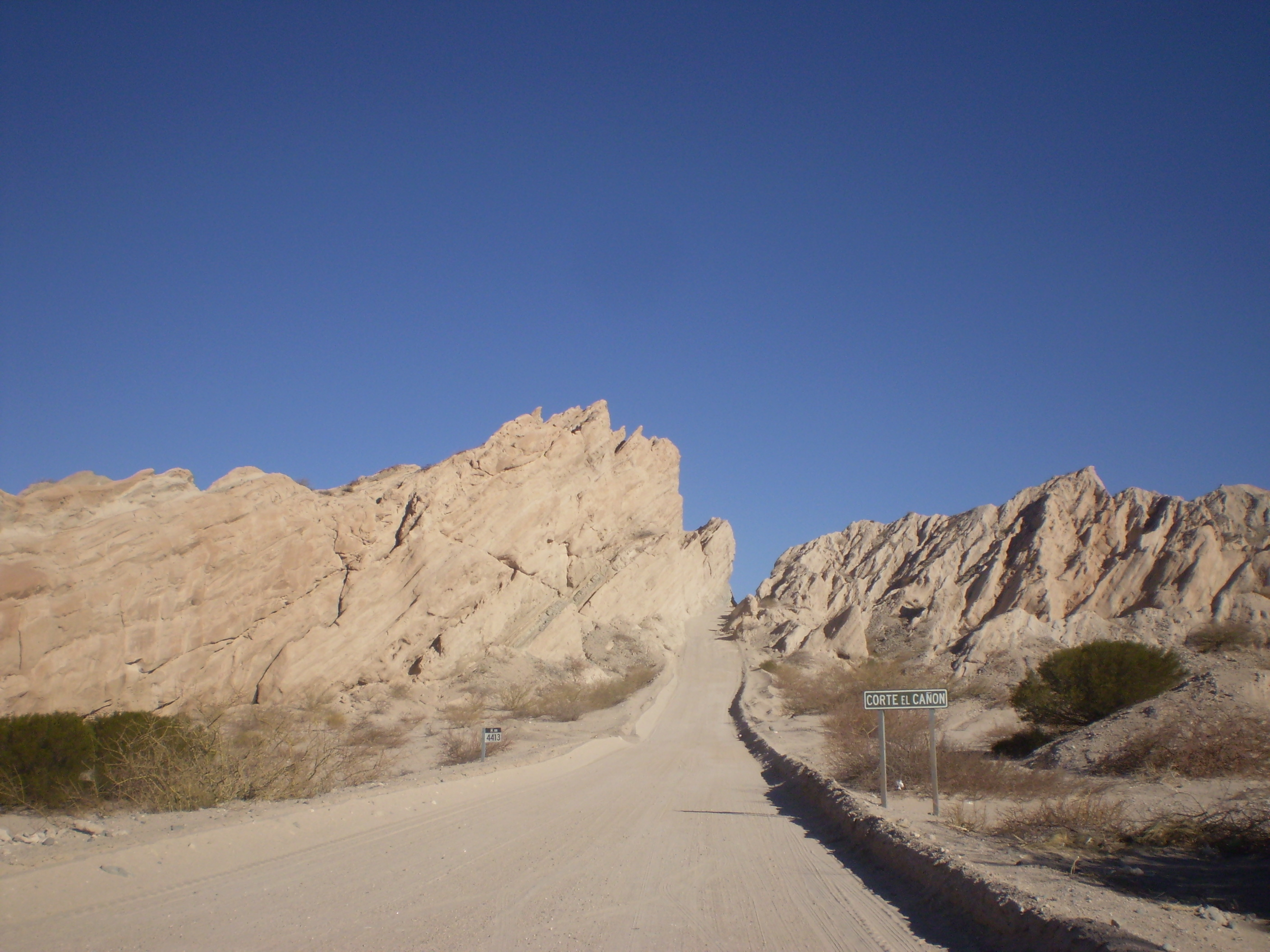
Quebrada de las Flechas ("Gorge of Arrows") rock formation just outside Angastaco

It is a place Angastaco a few miles to the west. It's something really worth knowing, but the access road is not for the tourist value of the place. It is impossible to describe in detail the topography. It takes photographed or filmed. It is a huge natural amphitheater surrounded by multicolored mountains with a predominantly red. But not far away but close at hand. Colorados charms are not limited to geography, to the landscape. In the center of the amphitheater religion and art have combined to give us "The Christ of Humility and Patience" made by an artist from Salta, Cassina Colo. Creole is a replica of a Spanish Christ. It is a seated Christ, with hair and blackened beard and wearing an expression that really impresses. Contemplation invites us to be more humane and pious. But missing element to complete the one-off spectacle offered by the Amphitheater "Los Colorados". Two condors appeared (maybe a couple) who initiated a prodigious ballet on the stage of multicolored hills. Disappeared behind a hill and reappear in unexpected places in a dance endless. All this without flapping their wings, using only variations of the updrafts and downdrafts, with a mastery of aviation experts. Sometimes they perch on the high peaks but then resumed his ballet in the red stage. Something not be forgotten!

== Geography ==
The town lies at an altitude of 1,990 m (6,529 ft). The climate is dry and arid with sunny days in general.

Distance from Salta to Cafayate: 261 km (162 mi)

From Salta to Cachi: 245 km (152 mi)

From Cafayate: 70 km (43 mi)

== Economy ==
Vine, wine, cereals, fruit. Spices: paprika, anise and cumin.

== Patron saint festivals ==
- December 8 - Virgin Valley
- Summer - Feast of the Grape and Foot-pressed Wine
