= Molinos Department =

Molinos
- Department
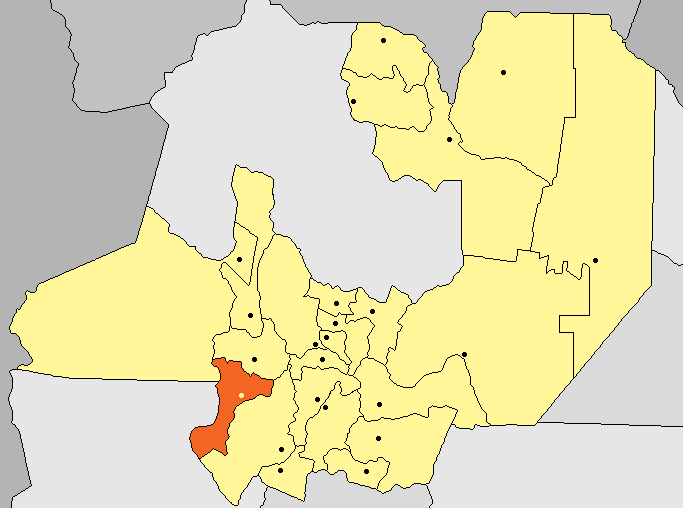
- Coordinates: 24°53′00″S 65°29′00″W
- Country: Argentina
- Province: Salta

Area
  - Total: 3,600 km^{2} (1,400 sq mi)

Population (2010)
  - Total: 5,652
  - Density: 1.6/km^{2} (4.1/sq mi)

Molinos is a department located in Salta Province, Argentina.

With an area of 3,600 km^{2} (1,390 sq mi) it borders Cachi Department to the north, San Carlos Department to the east, Catamarca Province to the west, and Los Andes Department to the northwest.

== Towns and municipalities ==
- Molinos
- Seclantás
