= Manuel Fernando de Aramburu =

Manuel Fernando de Aramburú y Frías (1770 – September 1843) was a Río de la Plata colonel who fought for the royalists during the Argentine War of Independence.

== Biography ==
Fernando de Aramburú was born in San Carlos, in the Viceroyalty of the Río de la Plata in 1770. He was educated in Spain, where he joined the army, and subsequently returned to Río de la Plata at the end of the 18th century, settling in Buenos Aires, and then in 1803 returned to Salta. In 1806 he joined the forces of his province, and accompanied the viceroy Sobremonte in his unsuccessful campaign to reconquer Buenos Aires, during the British invasions of the River Plate.

In 1810, he supported the May Revolution and voted in favour of the recognition of the Primera Junta in the open council held in Salta.

In 1815 he formed a cavalry squad in San Carlos, with which he opened a new front in the interior of the province, fighting against the patriots. He joined the forces of Joaquín de la Pezuela in his retreat to Upper Peru and participated in two combats in Tarija and Humahuaca. In this second battle he was shot in the tongue, losing his speech.

He remained in the royalist army of Upper Peru for the rest of the War of Independence, reaching the rank of colonel.

Fernando de Aramburu founded the town of Cafayate in 1840, where he died in 1843.
