= San Carlos Department =

San Carlos Department may refer to:

- San Carlos Department, Chile (former)
- San Carlos Department, Mendoza (Argentina)
- San Carlos Department, Salta (Argentina)
