= El Barrial =

Coordinates: 29°44′S 63°21′W

- Municipality and village
- Interactive map of El Barrial
- Country: Argentina
- Province: Salta
- Department: San Carlos
- Time zone: UTC−3 (ART)

El Barrial is a village and rural municipality in Salta Province in northwestern Argentina.
