= Cachi, Argentina =

Cachi
- City
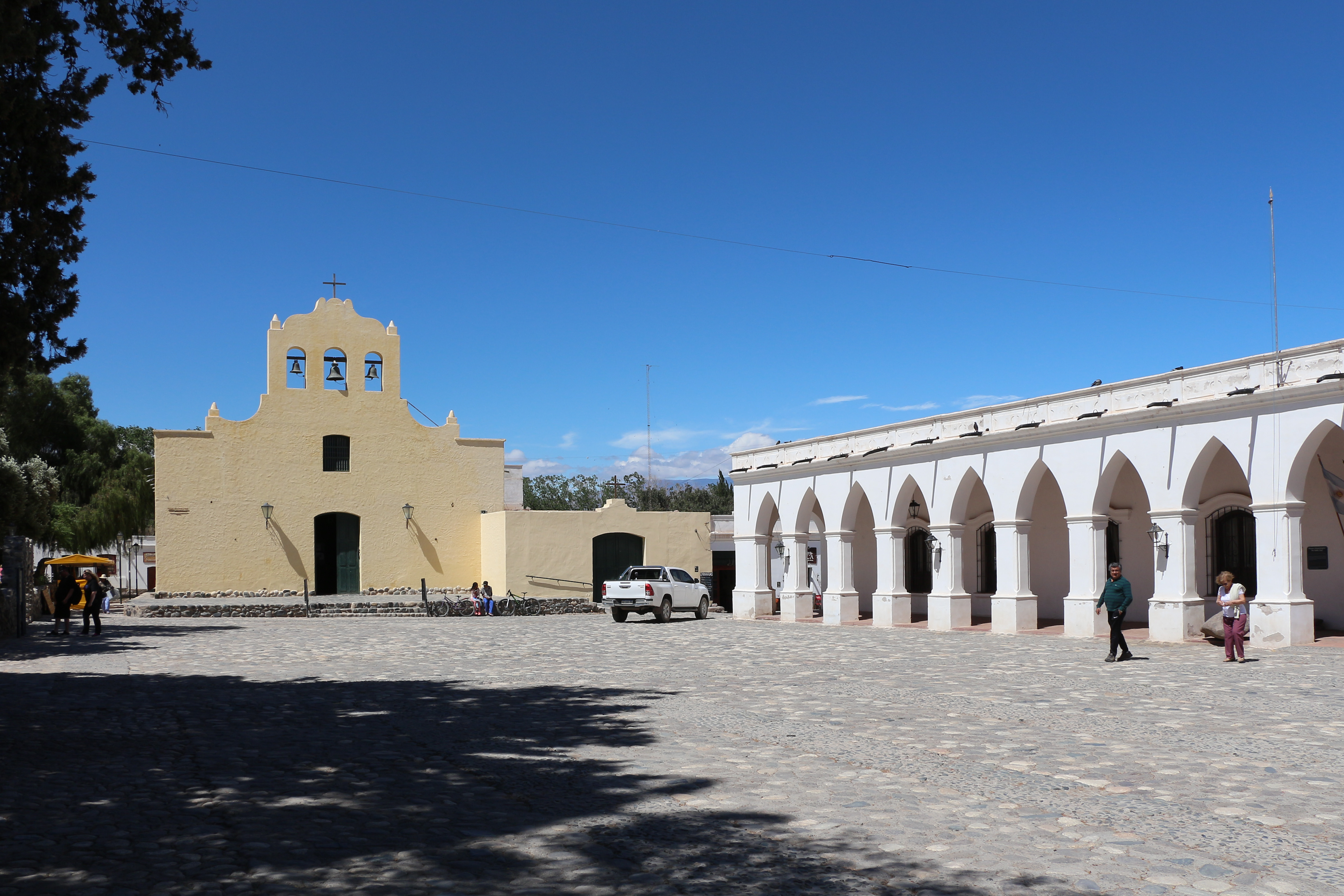
- Church of Cachi and Archaeological Museum

- Location of Cachi in Argentina
- Coordinates: 25.1194°S 66.1620°W
- Country: Argentina
- Province: Salta
- Department: Cachi

Government
  - Intendant: Américo Liendro (Unidos por Salta)
- Elevation: 2,531 m (8,304 ft)

Population (2001 Census)
  - Total: 5,254
- Demonym: n/a
- Time zone: UTC−3 (ART)
- CPA base: A4417
- Dialing code: +54 03868
- Climate: BWk

Cachi is a small city in Salta Province Argentina. It is the capital of the Cachi Department.

== Etymology ==
Although it is often stated that the name is derived from Quechuan and means salt since "the snow of this hill reminds of the color of salt," it is more likely that the name is of Cacán etymology : kak (stone) - chi (silence): silent stone.

== Geography ==
=== Location ===
Cachi is found in the northern sector of the Calchaquí Valleys in Argentina, at the foot of the Nevado de Cachi that flanks it from the west. The Cafayate, La Poma, Tolombón, Santa María, etc.) and places of interest like the Salar de Pipanaco

=== Climate ===
Climate data for Cachi, Argentina
Month	Jan	Feb	Mar	Apr	May	Jun	Jul	Aug	Sep	Oct	Nov	Dec	Year
Record high °C (°F)	33.8 (92.8)	34.0 (93.2)	33.8 (92.8)	32.8 (91.0)	31.2 (88.2)	28.8 (83.8)	29.5 (85.1)	31.0 (87.8)	32.2 (90.0)	34.1 (93.4)	34.0 (93.2)	34.9 (94.8)	34.9 (94.8)
Mean daily maximum °C (°F)	26.2 (79.2)	25.7 (78.3)	25.7 (78.3)	24.1 (75.4)	22.6 (72.7)	21.2 (70.2)	20.8 (69.4)	22.1 (71.8)	23.3 (73.9)	25.9 (78.6)	27.0 (80.6)	27.1 (80.8)	24.4 (75.9)
Daily mean °C (°F)	18.4 (65.1)	17.8 (64.0)	17.0 (62.6)	14.2 (57.6)	11.3 (52.3)	9.6 (49.3)	9.6 (49.3)	11.4 (52.5)	12.5 (54.5)	15.9 (60.6)	17.6 (63.7)	18.6 (65.5)	14.5 (58.1)
Mean daily minimum °C (°F)	11.8 (53.2)	11.0 (51.8)	9.7 (49.5)	5.0 (41.0)	0.8 (33.4)	−0.7 (30.7)	−0.8 (30.6)	0.8 (33.4)	2.2 (36.0)	5.7 (42.3)	8.7 (47.7)	10.8 (51.4)	5.4 (41.7)
Record low °C (°F)	5.0 (41.0)	4.4 (39.9)	0.2 (32.4)	−4.0 (24.8)	−7.1 (19.2)	−10.1 (13.8)	−10.6 (12.9)	−10.5 (13.1)	−8.6 (16.5)	−5.2 (22.6)	−0.7 (30.7)	1.8 (35.2)	−10.6 (12.9)
Average precipitation mm (inches)	67.1 (2.64)	34.5 (1.36)	14.5 (0.57)	2.3 (0.09)	0.0 (0.0)	1.3 (0.05)	0.1 (0.00)	0.5 (0.02)	0.4 (0.02)	2.9 (0.11)	3.3 (0.13)	28.4 (1.12)	155.2 (6.11)
Average relative humidity (%)	62	62	61	55	44	36	35	39	41	46	50	55	49
Source: Instituto Nacional de Tecnología Agropecuaria

== Population ==
The dynamic demographics are important: in 2001, 5254 people were counted, a 17.62% increase over the last census in 1991. Two factors have contributed to the increase: the high birth rate and the movement of people from Salta, Tucumán and Buenos Aires to the region.

== Tourism ==
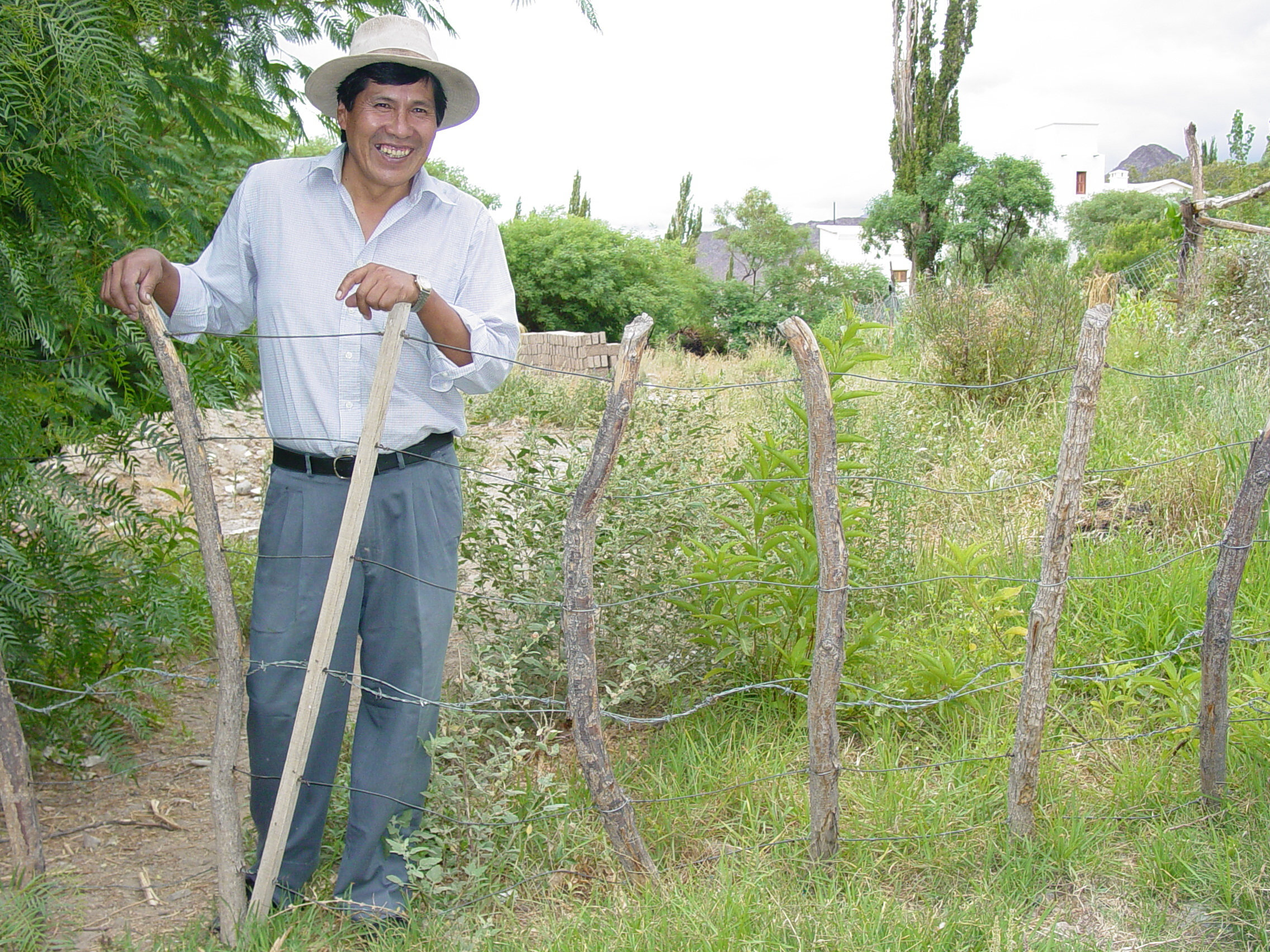
Argentinian farmer in Cachi.

The population is found surrounded by imposing snow-covered mountains reaching as much as 5,000 meters. The temperature is usually mild and the skies are almost always clear, making the region ideal for mountain climbing. The architecture of the small city is principally of colonial Spanish style with adobe homes painted white and built over bases of rock, sporting antique window grills forged of iron. In the Central Plaza is the Church of Chachi, a recognized National Historical Monument, built in the sixteenth century with an exterior from the nineteenth century. Its beams, altars and confession booths are all carved from the porous wood of the cactus Echinopsis atacamensis. The front of the plaza is the main entrance to the Pío Pablo Díaz Archaeological Museum. This museum contains more than 5,000 pieces covering a time period of 10,000 years with a majority covering the time period between 800 BC and 1600 AD. Ancient pictographs figure prominently in the museum, and the staff is extremely knowledgeable about them---and comparative pictographs around the world. 10 kilometers to the south-southwest of Cachi lies the important ruins of Puerta de La Paya.

Cachi also has the world's highest commercial vineyard, Finca Altura Máxima, at 3,111 meters. It belongs to Bodega Colomé.
