= San Carlos Department, Salta =

San Carlos
- Department
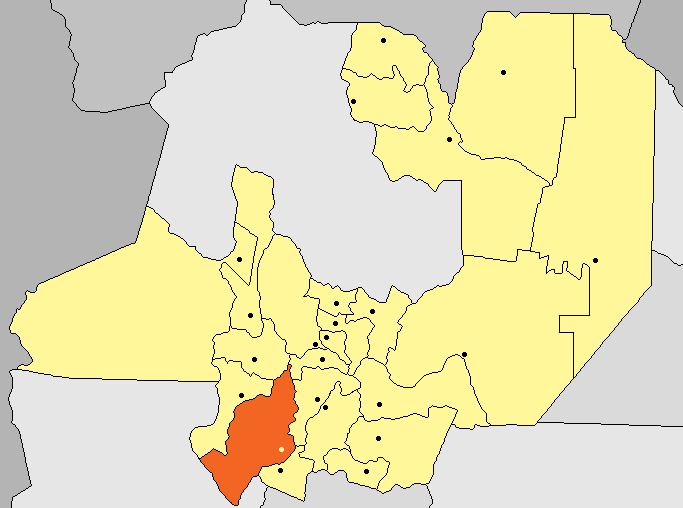
- Coordinates: 25°53′9″S 65°55′45″W
- Country: Argentina
- Province: Salta

Area
  - Total: 5,125 km^{2} (1,979 sq mi)

Population (2010)
  - Total: 7,208
  - Density: 1.406/km^{2} (3.643/sq mi)

San Carlos is a department located in Salta Province, in Argentina.

With an area of 5,125 km^{2} (1,979 sq mi) it borders to the east with the La Viña Department, to the southeast with Cafayate Department, to the northeast with Chicoana Department, to the north with Cachi Department, to the west with Molinos Department and to the south and southwest with the province of Catamarca.

== Towns and municipalities ==
- Angastaco
- Animaná
- San Carlos
- El Barrial
- Jasimaná
- La Angostura
- Mina Don Otto
- Monteverde
- Pucará
- Santa Rosa
- Amblayo
- Paraje Corralito
- Paraje San Antonio
- Payogastilla
