= Seclantás =

Coordinates: 25°18′S 66°15′W

- Municipality and village
- Interactive map of Seclantás
- Country: Argentina
- Province: Salta Province
- Time zone: UTC−3 (ART)

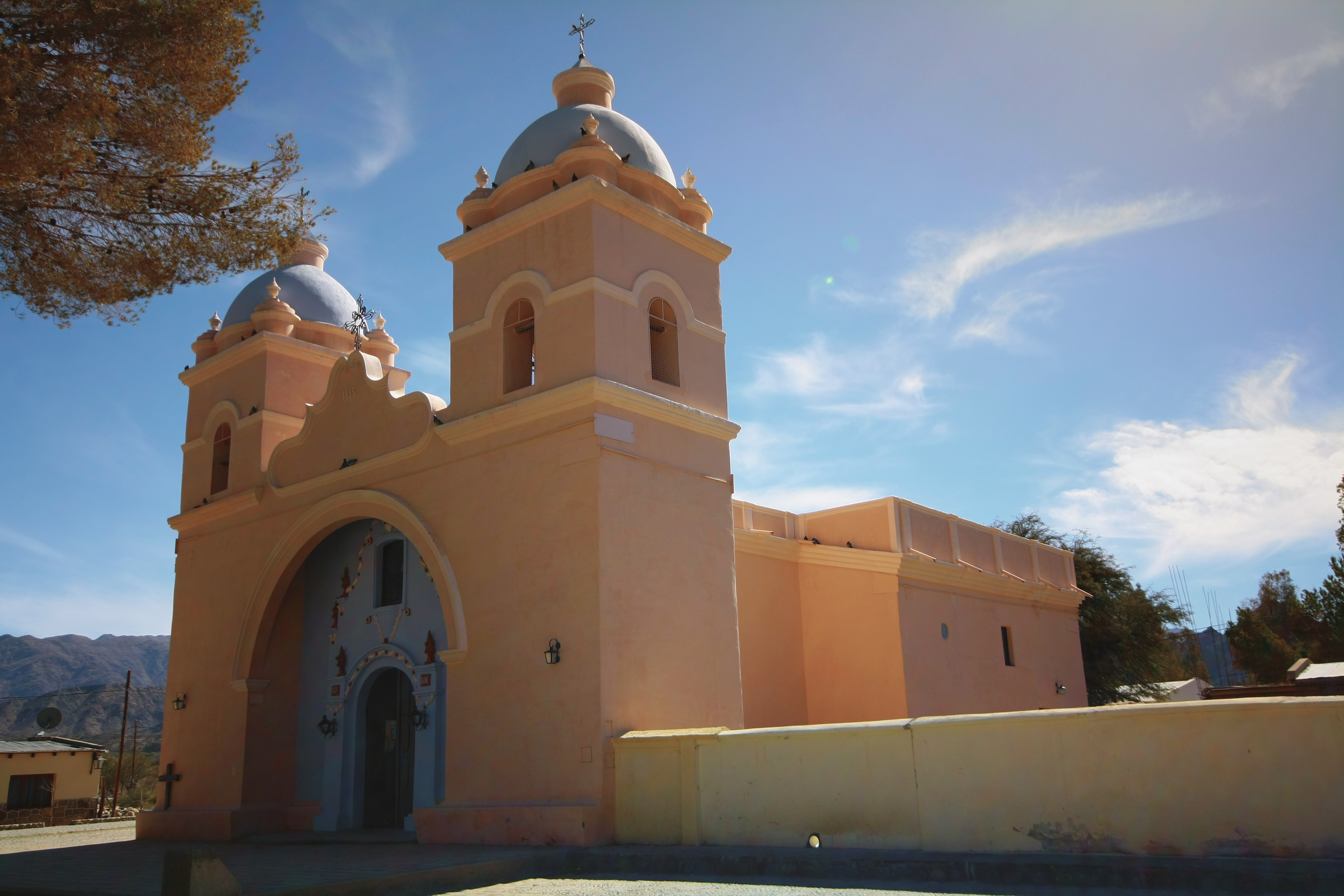
Seclantás

Seclantás is a small village located in northwestern Argentina, 165 km south west from Salta. Historically, the Calchaqui Valley was occupied by several tribes, each with its own chief. In the region, where Seclantas is nowadays, there lived a tribe whose chief was called “Seclanta”. Hence the name of the village.

== Population ==
The population of Seclantas is 716.

== Weather ==
The average temperature for the town is around 60 °F. During the summer, Seclantas has its rainy season with around 70% chances of rain.
