= Calchaquí Valley =

Area in Argentina

Coordinates: 26.007778°S 66.033056°W

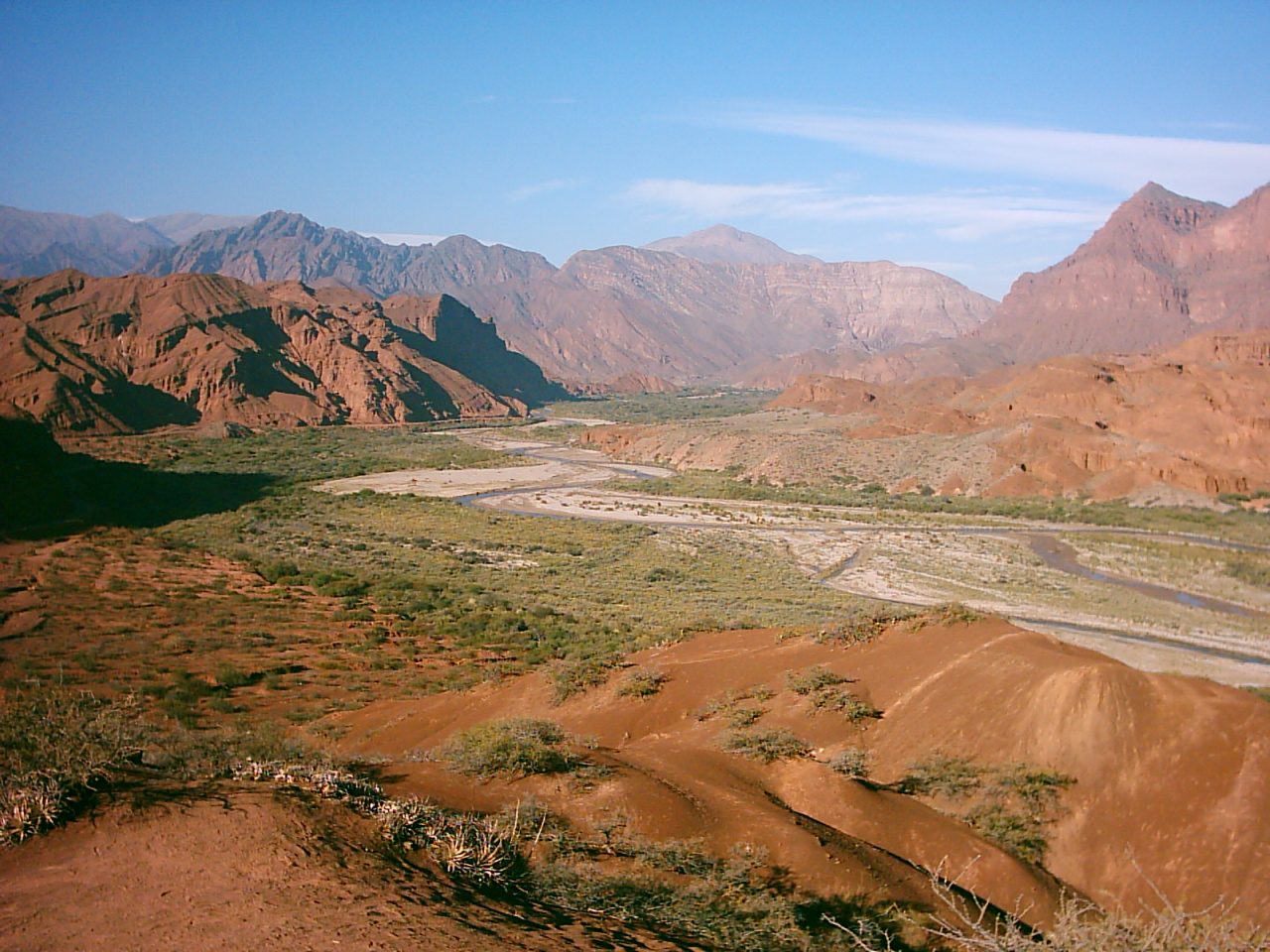
Quebrada de las Conchas, also known as Quebrada de Cafayate.

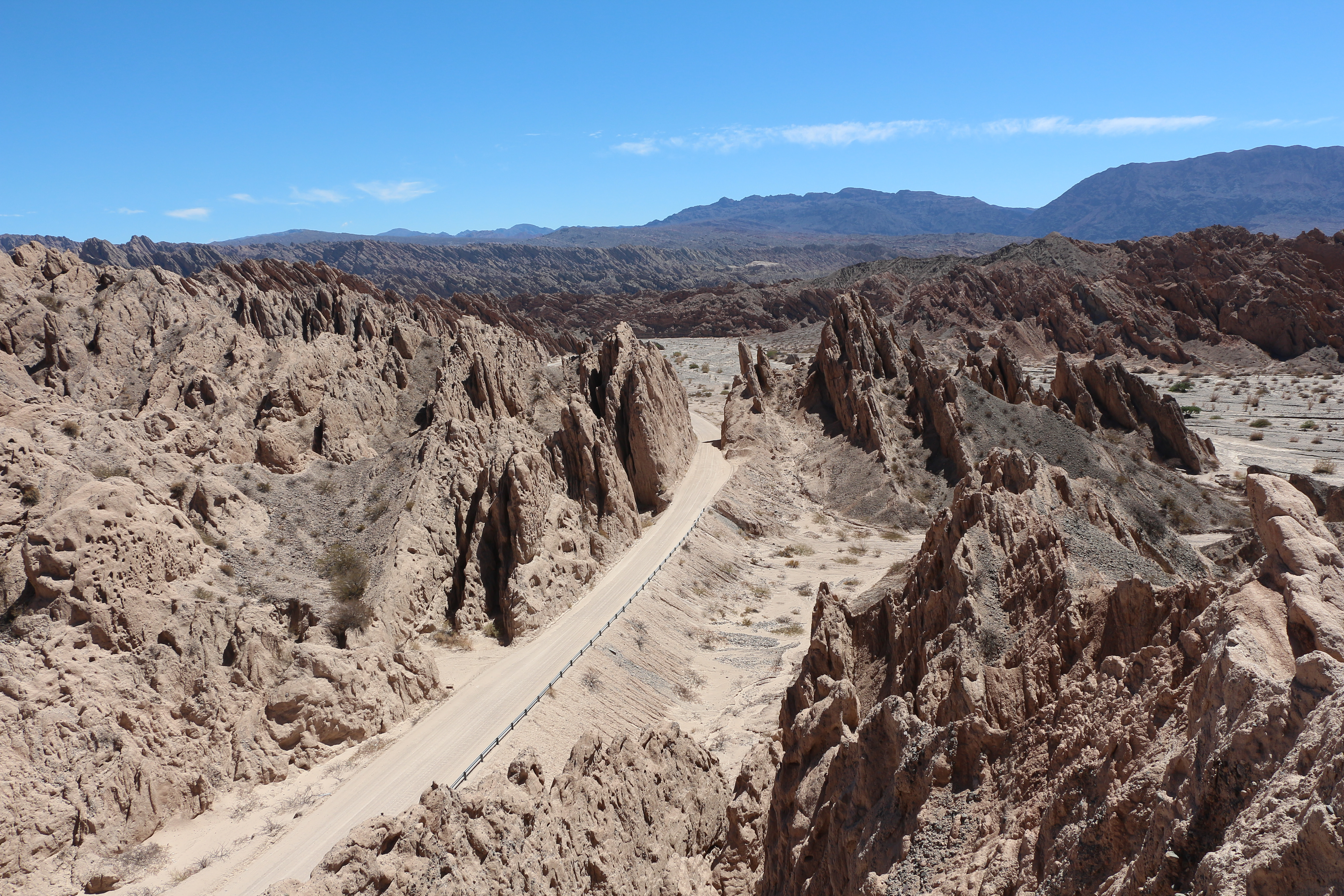
Quebrada de las Flechas.

The Calchaquí Valley (Spanish: Valles Calchaquíes) is an area in the northwestern region of Argentina which crosses the provinces of Catamarca, Tucumán, Jujuy and Salta. It is best known for its contrast of colors and its unique geography that ranges from the mountain desert to the subtropical forest.

== Geography ==
The Calchaquí Valley is a graben valley, oriented north–south, between the Sierra del Aconquija and Cumbres Calchaquíes (4177 m) ranges to the east and the Sierra de Quilmes (5468 m) to the west. These ranges are part of the Sierras Pampeanas, a series of mountain ranges which extend north and south through Northwestern Argentina, east of the Andes.

There are a number of valleys and rivers within the Calchaquí Valley that have their own name, such as the Quebrada del Toro (Gorge of the Bull), Valle de Lerma (Lerma Valley) near Salta city, the Quebrada de Escoipe formed by the Escoipe River, the Valle Encantado at the feet of the Cuesta del Obispo, the Quebrada de las Conchas of the Conchas River near Cafayate, the valley of the Santa María River, and the Calchaquí River itself. The headwaters of the Santa María River are in the Sierra de Quilmes, where it is named Colorado River. It joins the Calchaquí River to form the Conchas, which is a tributary of the Salado.

== Ecology ==
Most of the Calchaquí Valley is part of the High Monte ecoregion, a semi-arid montane shrubland which lies between the eastern Sierras Pampeanas and the Andes. The eastward-facing slopes of the surrounding mountains intercept moisture-bearing winds from the east, which support the Southern Andean Yungas humid forests. The Central Andean puna subalpine and alpine grasslands cover the highest portions of the surrounding ranges.

== History ==
Humans have inhabited the valleys for at least 8000 years. The Santamariano culture thrived in the valleys from approximately 1000 and 1480 AD. The period saw a growth in population and irrigated agriculture, with towns and villages on the main valley floor and along the western tributary streams. The Ruins of Quilmes in Tucumán Province may have housed about 5000 people at the settlement's peak. The valleys were conquered by the Inca Empire between 1470 and 1480. The valleys were part of the empire's southeastern Qullasuyu province. The Inca extended their road network through the region, and built fortresses and mountaintop shrines. Food crops grown in the valleys included maize, Chenopodium, tubers, beans, and chili peppers (Capsicum). Manufacturing activities in the valley included copper and gold metallurgy, marine shell, mica, obsidian, stone beads, and ceramics.

The Spanish conquered the Inca Empire in the 1530s, and by 1543 Inca control of the valleys had collapsed. The people of the region resisted Spanish conquest until 1650. Tribes of the area included the Calchaquíes, Tafí, and the Yokavil (Santa María).

== Attractions ==
Among the most visited tourist attractions of the valley are Tafí del Valle, Cafayate, Molinos, San Carlos, Santa María and Cachi at the western end of the valley, as well as the Los Cardones National Park, and the Los Sosa Provincial Park in Tucumán. In several parts of the valley there are numerous vineyards, especially in the Cafayate area.

== Quebrada de Cafayate Managed Nature Reserve ==
Quebrada de Cafayate, also known as Quebrada de las Conchas, is a steep-sided canyon where the Conchas River exits northwestwards through the mountains that form the eastern side of the valley. It is located near the town of Cafayate in Salta Province, and includes of the departments of La Viña, Guachipas and Cafayate. In 1995 the canyon was declared a managed nature reserve by decree No. 6806, with an area of 25,784 ha.

Located 90 km southwest of the city of Salta. This ravine is an area of great scenic beauty with very striking rock formations for their reddish colorations.

The reserve protects the curious geological formations and high walls of unique landscape value, as well as an important paleontological site belonging to the period Cretaceous. The ravine is geologically relatively recent, produced by tectonic movements that took place in the last two million years.

National Route 68, which connects the town of Cafayate with the city of Salta, runs through the reserve along the Conchas River. Along its route one can see landscapes of very varied colors and geoforms of great variety among which are the Garganta del Diablo and the amphitheater of reddish sedimentary rocks. In the past (when the past was humid) these formations were cascades of fresh water and that by the flow of concentrated water they were eroding the stone, which today astonish by its special configuration.

Other geoforms that can be observed at the edge of the route are. The Amphitheater, The Friar, The Toad, Windows, Castles, etc. and about 7 km from Cafayate Los Médanos, deposit of fine calcareous aeolian sands.

Due to its rich archeological and historical past, the reserve has numerous fossil remains. In the area near the Morales bridge, fossil frogs of the group of pípidos are found. There are layers of marine and continental limestones very rich in fossils and even in dinosaur footprints. Also, the so-called stromatolites are presented. In the Yesera, there is an important fossil fish deposit, evidence of a process that would have occurred some 15 million years ago: the last entry of the sea to the continent.

In recent archaeological investigations it was discovered that a few meters away from the current route 68 the Inca road ran, adding archaeological relevance to the site.

The creek and its surroundings one of the important areas for the conservation of birds in Argentina.

== Gallery ==
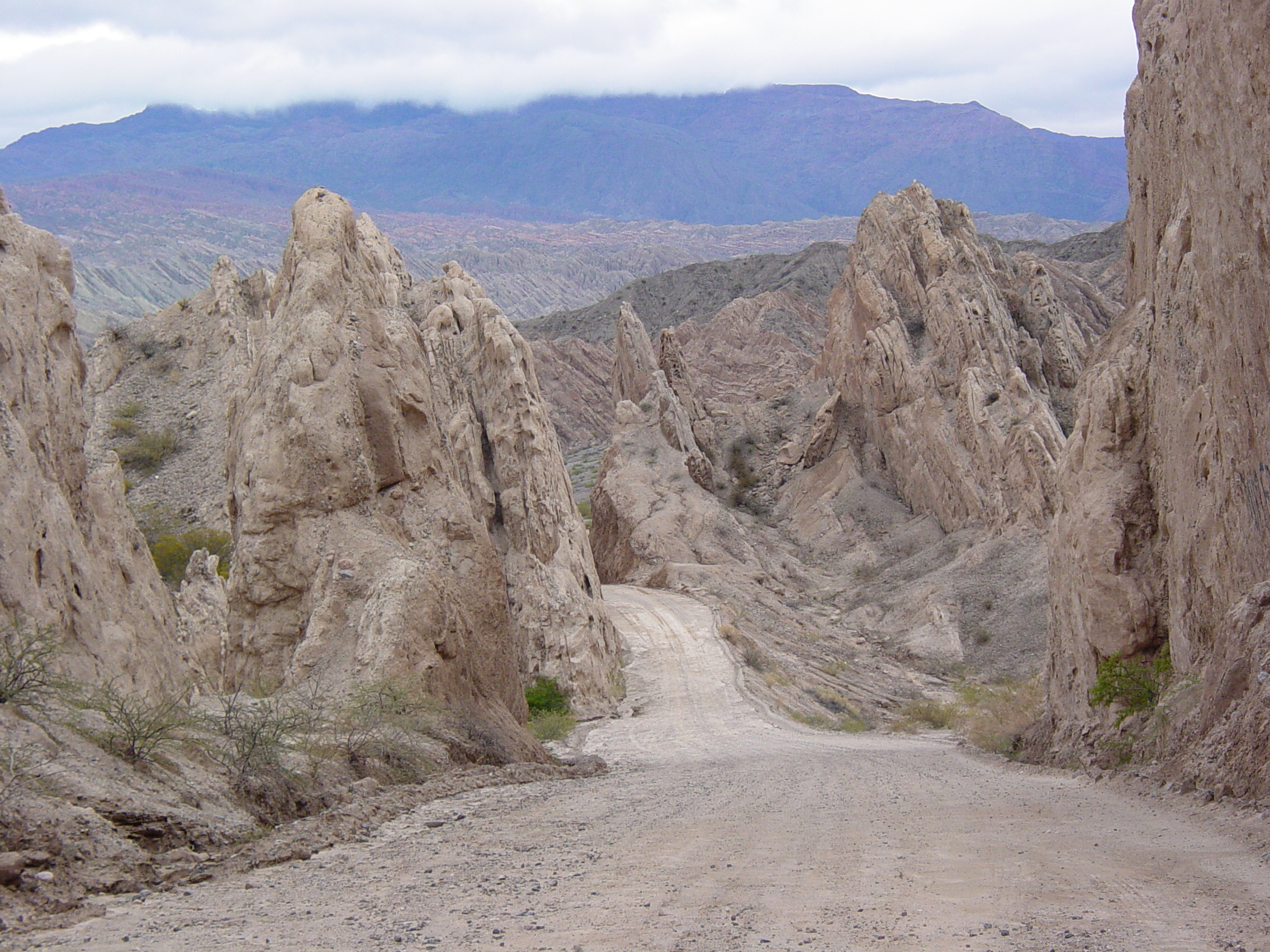
Quebrada de las Flechas

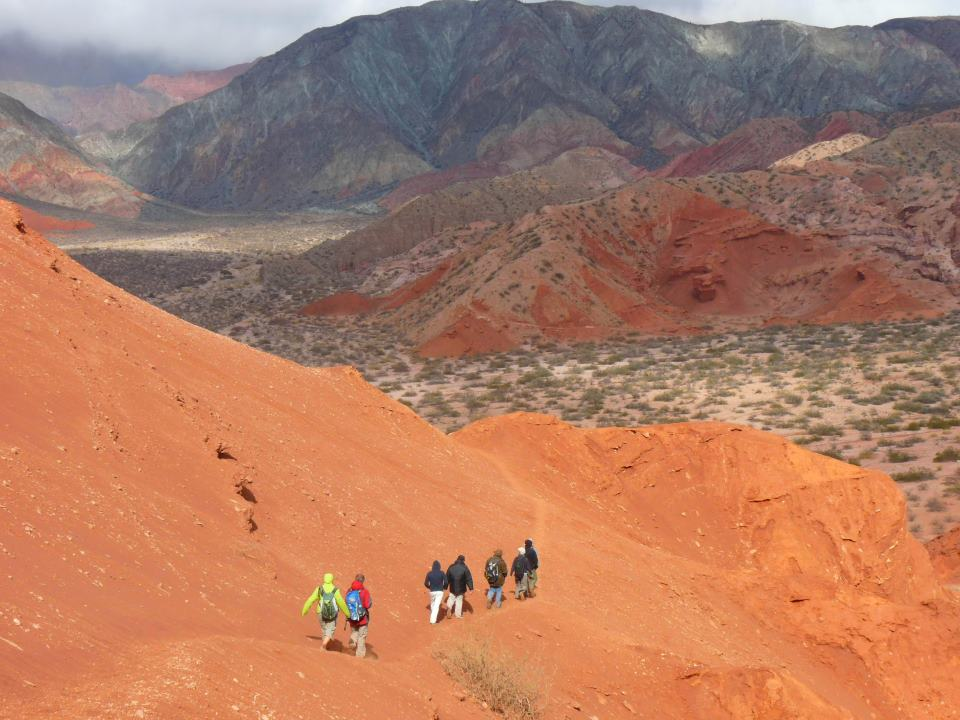
Quebrada de las conchas

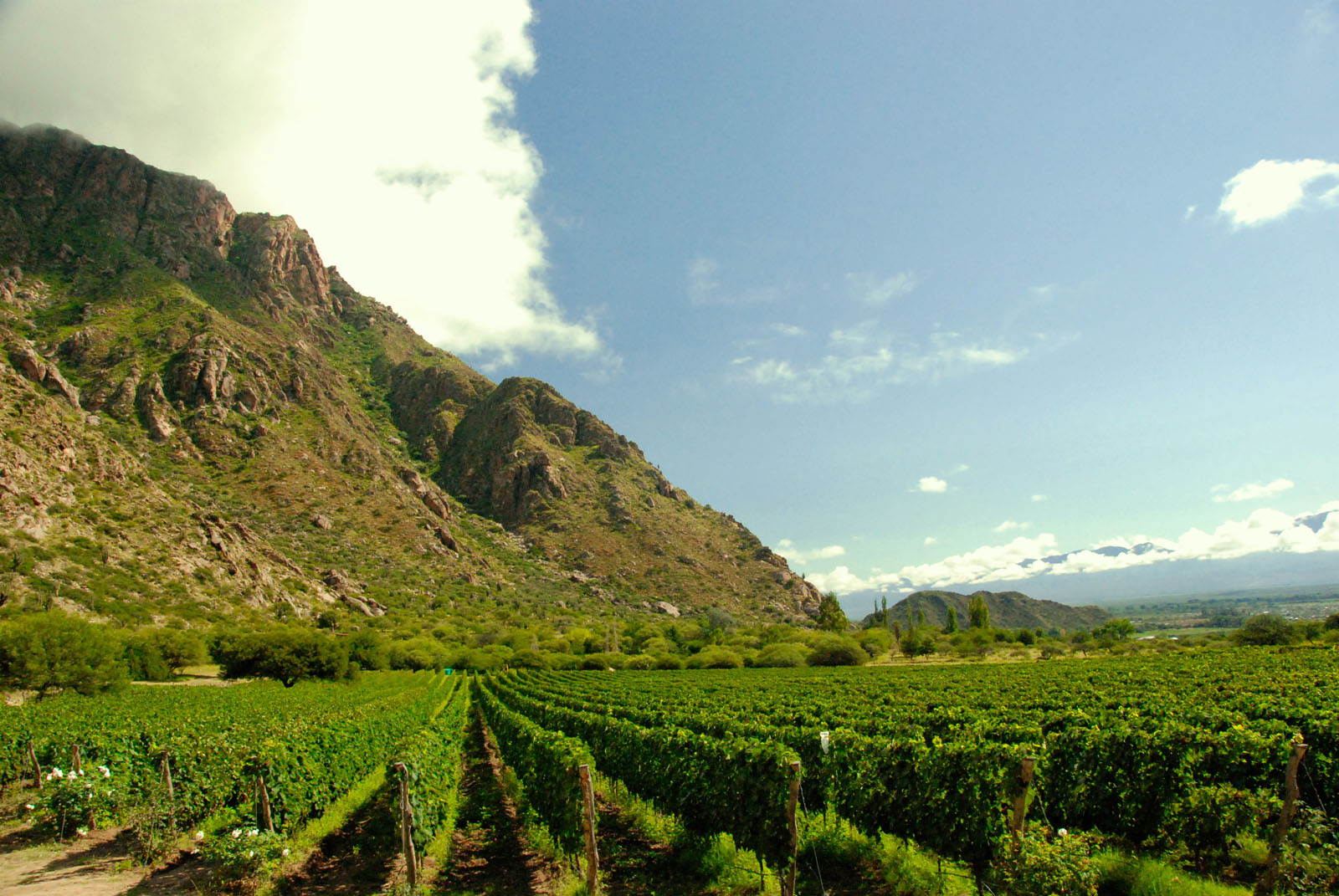
Vineyards in Cafayate

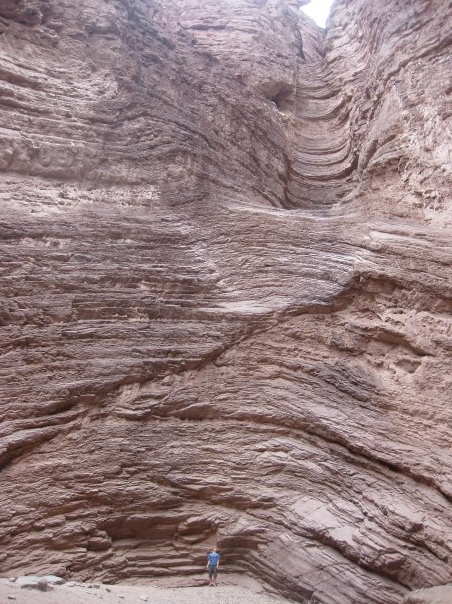
Garganta del Diablo

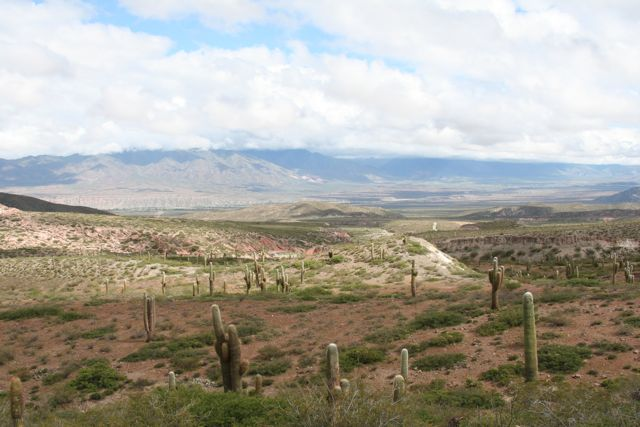
Cachi overview

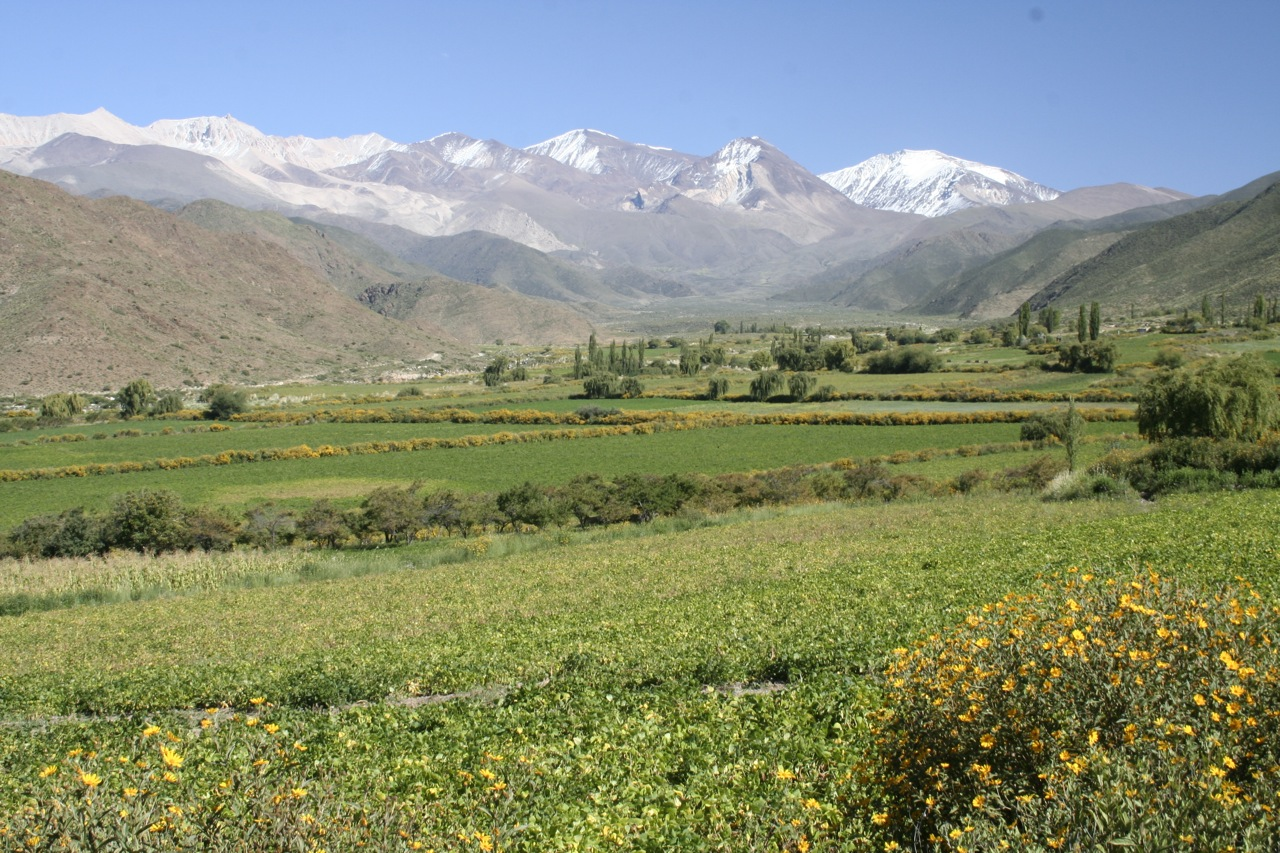
Surroundings of Cachi
