= San Carlos, Salta =

Coordinates: 25°54′S 65°56′W

San Carlos
- Municipality and village
- Interactive map of San Carlos
- Country: Argentina
- Province: Salta
- Department: San Carlos
- Time zone: UTC−3 (ART)
- Climate: BWk

San Carlos is a head village of the department of San Carlos, Province of Salta, Argentina. San Carlos is a historic village in Calchaquíes Valleys located at the National Route 40, 27 km from Cafayate.

On February 18, 1975, the National Executive Power through the Decree 370 declared some areas of the village of San Carlos to be National Historic Place.

== Toponymy ==
Eponymous of San Carlos of Borromeo.

== Population Density ==
According to the INDEC, in 2001 there were 1887 residents in San Carlos, which represents a 26,5% increase compared to 1492 residents of the previous census in 1991.

== History ==
Four Spain cities were destroyed there: the second location of El Barco, which was established in 1551 by Juan Núñez del Prado; “Córdoba del Calchaquí”, which was established in 1559 by Juan Pérez de Zurita; “San Clemente de la Nueva Sevilla”, which was established in 1577 by Gonzalo de Abreu y Figueroa and “Nuestra Señora de Guadalupe”, which was established in 1630 by Felipe de Albornoz. All of them did not last long and disappeared because of the defense of the Calchaquí indigenous people, who were the local part of the Diaguita ethnic.

After 1637, the Jesuits established in this place the Mission of San Carlos; although it lasted some years more, it was destroyed in 1660 during the last of Calchaquí war. Even though the mission was reestablished after being destroyed, the Calchaquí Valleys were almost deserted for many years since the majority of its population was moved a great distance to Córdoba and even to the proximities of Buenos Aires. The village was growing around the mission.

San Carlos was the most important population of the valleys (at the time of independence) which had a noticeable Peninsular tendency and it constitutes itself as the center of the royalist opposition led by colonel Aramburú. In 1813, Pio Tristán's officers sacked the village and destroyed everything so as it would not fall into the power of the patriotic force hands which- after the battle of Tucumán- advanced towards Salta.

In the following months, the population had been declared in [favor] of the independence struggle and because of this in those days colonel Gregorio Aráoz de Lamadrid was helped with mules and horses in 1817 when he was making an incursion into Upper Peru.

Being one of the most important villages of Salta, the relevant actions were carried out to make San Carlos the capital city of Salta but it lost with Salta by one vote.

Artisans work and sell their products and they work with fabric, leather, ceramic, symbol and regional wine.

There is an inn and a municipal campsite.

== Church of San Carlos Borromeo - San Carlos 1801/1854 ==
Main article: Church of San Carlos.

In 1719, Maestre de Campo Fernando de Lisperguer y Aguirre ordered to build a chapel in his farm in San Carlos. The construction of the current church began in 1801 and it was consecrated in 1854. This church, which is the biggest in the Calchaquí Valleys and the unique with a transept and a dome, reflects the importance that it had in the region: San Carlos disputed the city of Salta the honor to be the capital of the province.

The appearance of stylistic Europeanized elements shows its own way to differentiate and highlight the church's building. The strong shaking of the 1930s earthquake weakened the original vaulted roof which forced to substitute it with trusses and zinc sheets; thus, the spatial quality of the unique nave, which was built with thick adobe walls, was altered. The transept arms and the apse conserved the dome built over wooden beams, which were supported by half point arches. The end of the apse is covered by a construction of retable, which is common in all the valley.

A remarkable popular imagery of a Hispanic style adorns the altars. In the facade the illuminated plans of the towers contrast with the shade of the arch of the big superior shelter and the entrance portico, characterized by the columns, which rotated in respect of the general plan, hold three arches of half point.

== Tourism ==
San Carlos forms part of the tourist circuit of the National Route 40.

There are festivals and craft fairs to visit, some of them are movable like Fiesta del Barro Calchaquí, Festival of arts and fairs of the Valleys. Many teenagers chose to go to the "discos" in Cafayate because of its proximity.

During February, people can take part of the valley carnival with copleros, people covered with flour and lot of basil.

Its patron saint's day is on 4 November, date in which San Carlos’ residents carry their patron saint San Carlos de Borromeo through the streets.

=== Village’s attractions ===
Celia's cascade: It is located 3 km North and it is an artificial waterfall in the Sauce's canal which is surrounded by poplars.

San Lucas: It is located 12 km West and it is a small village which is plentiful of figs and walnuts.

Peñas Blancas: It is located 5 km from San Carlos. In that place there was an Indian cemetery.

Río Calchaquí: In this place, fishing enthusiasts can capture abundant specimens. The National Route 40 accompanies its course.

There is a campsite and an inn for those who want to visit this place.

== Seismicity ==
The seismicity of the area of Salta is frequent and the intensity is low, and there is a seismic silence from a moderate to severe earthquake every 40 years.

Area of average seismicity with 6.1 on the Richter scale, 5 years ago, other earthquake 70 years before with 7.0 on the Richter scale.

== Parishes of the Catholic church of San Carlos ==
Catholic church

Territorial Prelature	Cafayate
Church	San Carlos Borromeo

== Climate ==
Climate data for San Carlos, Salta
Month	Jan	Feb	Mar	Apr	May	Jun	Jul	Aug	Sep	Oct	Nov	Dec	Year
Record high °C (°F)	38.2 (100.8)	36.8 (98.2)	35.5 (95.9)	33.1 (91.6)	34.6 (94.3)	32.1 (89.8)	33.1 (91.6)	34.5 (94.1)	36.0 (96.8)	38.3 (100.9)	38.8 (101.8)	37.6 (99.7)	38.8 (101.8)
Mean daily maximum °C (°F)	29.9 (85.8)	29.6 (85.3)	28.9 (84.0)	26.2 (79.2)	23.3 (73.9)	20.6 (69.1)	20.8 (69.4)	23.5 (74.3)	25.2 (77.4)	28.5 (83.3)	29.9 (85.8)	30.6 (87.1)	26.4 (79.5)
Daily mean °C (°F)	22.1 (71.8)	21.4 (70.5)	20.5 (68.9)	16.7 (62.1)	12.6 (54.7)	9.4 (48.9)	10.3 (50.5)	12.9 (55.2)	15.1 (59.2)	19.2 (66.6)	21.0 (69.8)	22.2 (72.0)	16.9 (62.4)
Mean daily minimum °C (°F)	15.6 (60.1)	14.6 (58.3)	13.6 (56.5)	8.7 (47.7)	3.5 (38.3)	0.1 (32.2)	0.5 (32.9)	3.5 (38.3)	5.2 (41.4)	9.7 (49.5)	12.5 (54.5)	14.4 (57.9)	8.5 (47.3)
Record low °C (°F)	6.8 (44.2)	6.3 (43.3)	5.6 (42.1)	−0.4 (31.3)	−7.2 (19.0)	−9.5 (14.9)	−8.7 (16.3)	−6.0 (21.2)	−4.0 (24.8)	−0.4 (31.3)	−0.6 (30.9)	5.0 (41.0)	−9.5 (14.9)
Average precipitation mm (inches)	48.3 (1.90)	13.6 (0.54)	8.4 (0.33)	2.6 (0.10)	0.0 (0.0)	1.0 (0.04)	0.4 (0.02)	0.2 (0.01)	0.4 (0.02)	1.7 (0.07)	5.8 (0.23)	26.8 (1.06)	109.2 (4.30)
Average relative humidity (%)	64	63	65	65	62	59	55	54	53	55	57	60	60
Mean monthly sunshine hours	244.9	226.0	241.8	240.0	244.9	228.0	241.8	254.2	255.0	257.3	261.0	251.1	2,946
Mean daily sunshine hours	7.9	8.0	7.8	8.0	7.9	7.6	7.8	8.2	8.5	8.3	8.7	8.1	8.1
Source: Instituto Nacional de Tecnología Agropecuaria

== See also ==
- Argentina Wine Route
- List of earthquakes in Argentina
