= Cafayate =

- Town
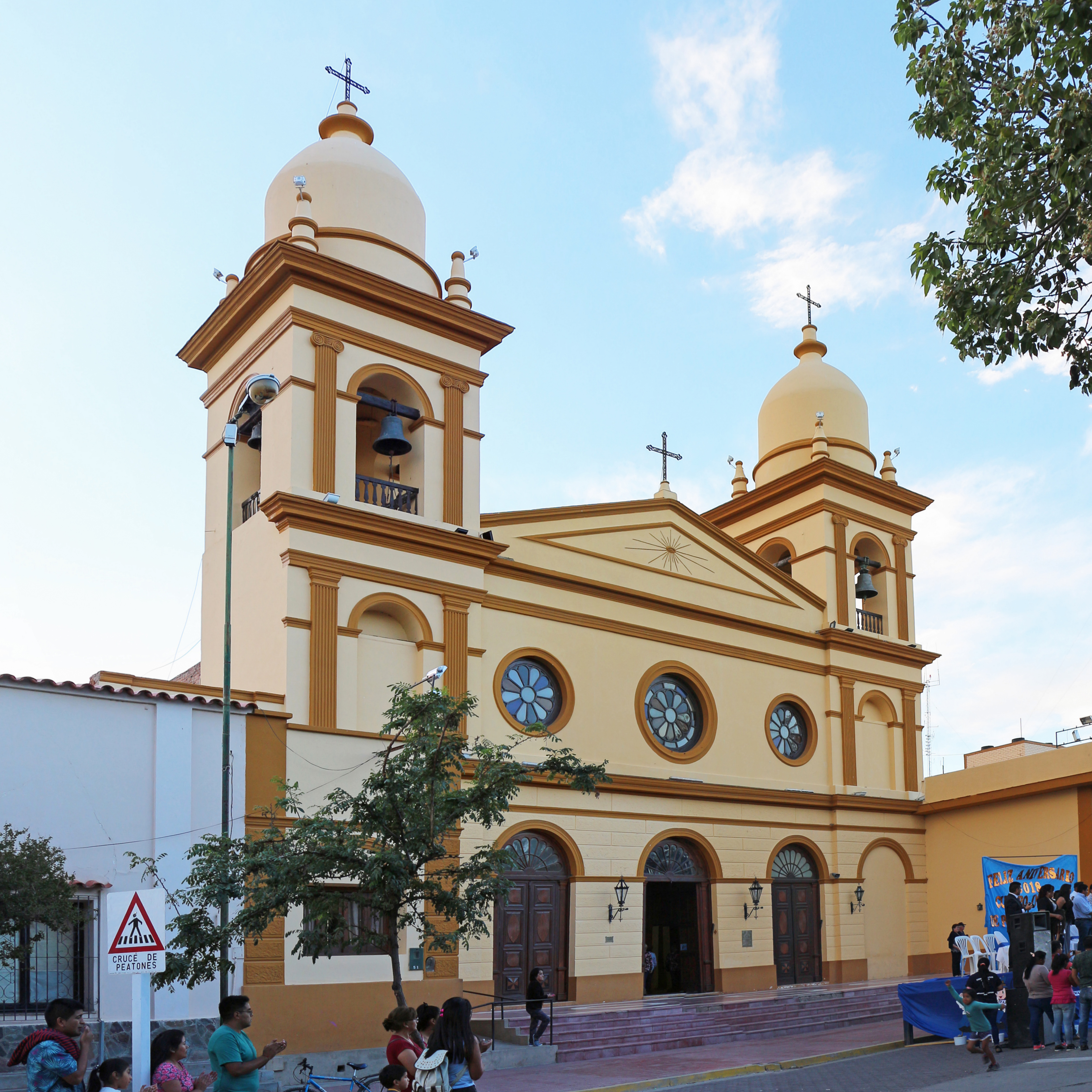
- Our Lady of Rosary Cathedral

- Coat of arms

- Location of Cafayate in Argentina
- Coordinates: 26°5′S 65°58′W
- Country: Argentina
- Province: Salta
- Department: Cafayate

Government
  - Intendant: Rita Guevara (Unidos por Salta)
- Elevation: 1,683 m (5,522 ft)

Population
  - Total: 11,785
- Time zone: UTC−3 (ART)
- CPA base: A4427
- Dialing code: +54 3868
- Climate: BWk

Cafayate (Spanish pronunciation: [kafaˈʎate]) is a town located at the central zone of the Valles Calchaquíes in the province of Salta, Argentina. It sits 1,683 metres (5,522 ft) above mean sea level, at a distance of 189 kilometres (117 mi) from Salta City and 1,329 kilometres (826 mi) from Buenos Aires. It has about 12,000 inhabitants (2001 census [INDEC]).

The town is an important tourist centre for exploring the Calchaquíes valleys, and because of the quality and originality of the wines produced in the area. The town was founded in 1840 by Manuel Fernando de Aramburu, at the site of a mission. In 1863 the Cafayate Department was created, of which Cafayate is the capital.

== Etymology ==
The Cafayates were a tribe of the Diaguita-Calchaquí group, which, together with the related Tolombón, inhabited the Valles Calchaquíes prior to the arrival of the Spanish Conquistadores. Their language was known as Cacán. Like other Diaguita tribes, they had recently fallen under the influence of the Incas, after a prolonged resistance. They later mounted a fierce resistance to the Spaniards.

The name is considered to originate from Cacán, meaning 'Grave of Sorrows'.

== Wines ==
The wine production is most important in the Valles Calchaquíes. The wines produced in the region benefit from the low-humidity mild weather of the valleys that receive an average of less than 250 mm of precipitation per year. The most characteristic type of wine cultivated in the area is torrontés. Most wine-cellars around the town host free guided tours.

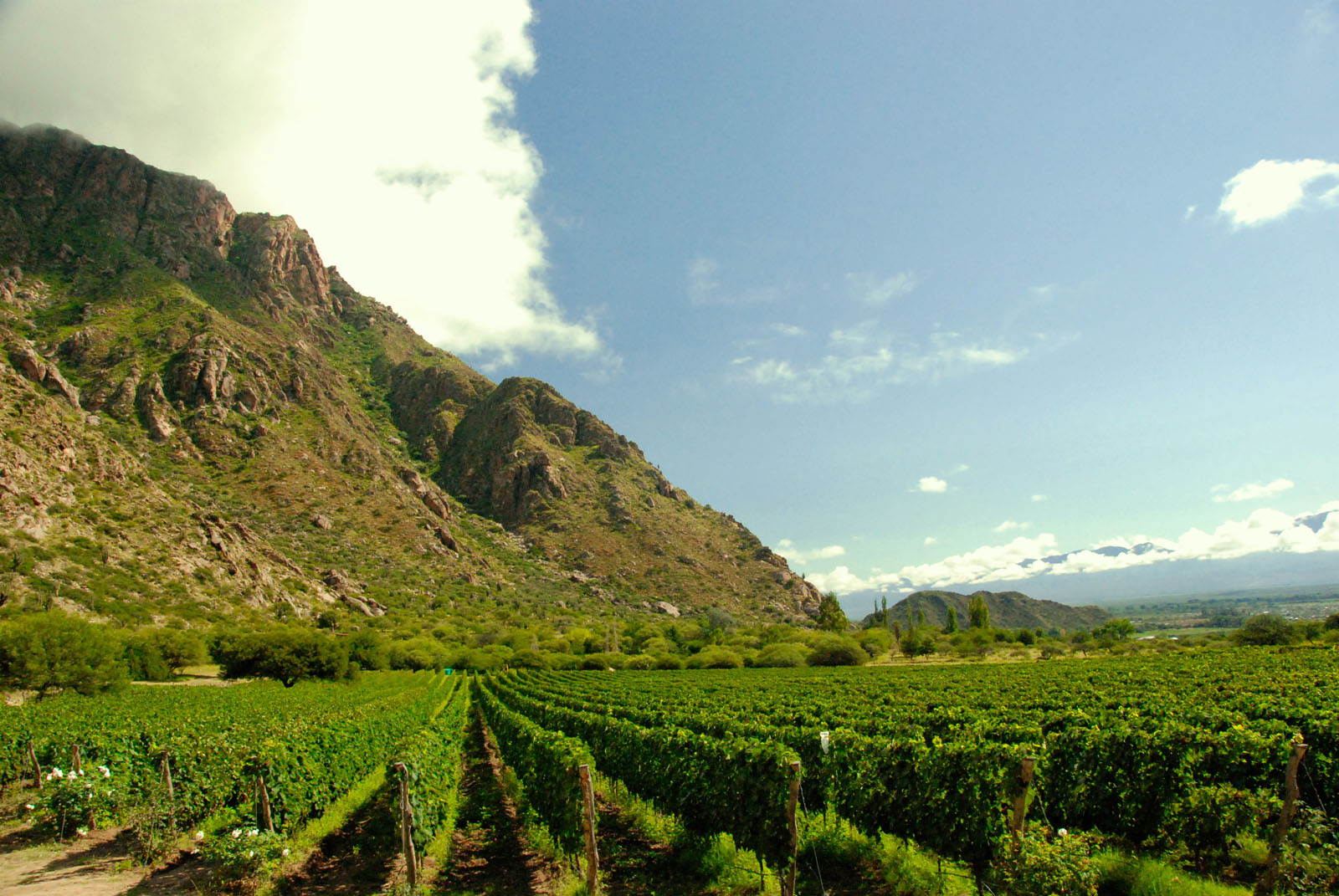
View of a vineyard bordering on a mountain

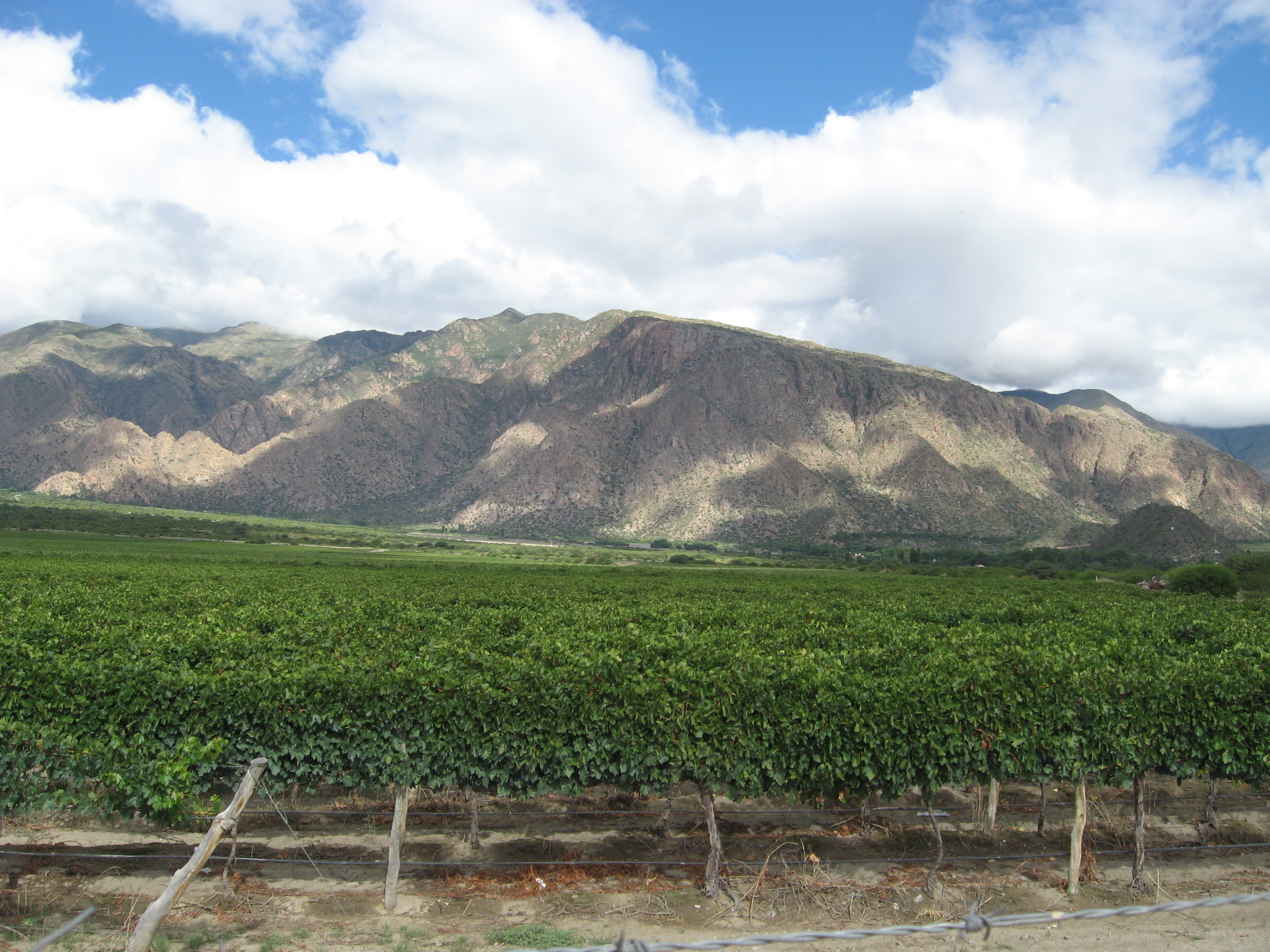
Just 3 blocks from town

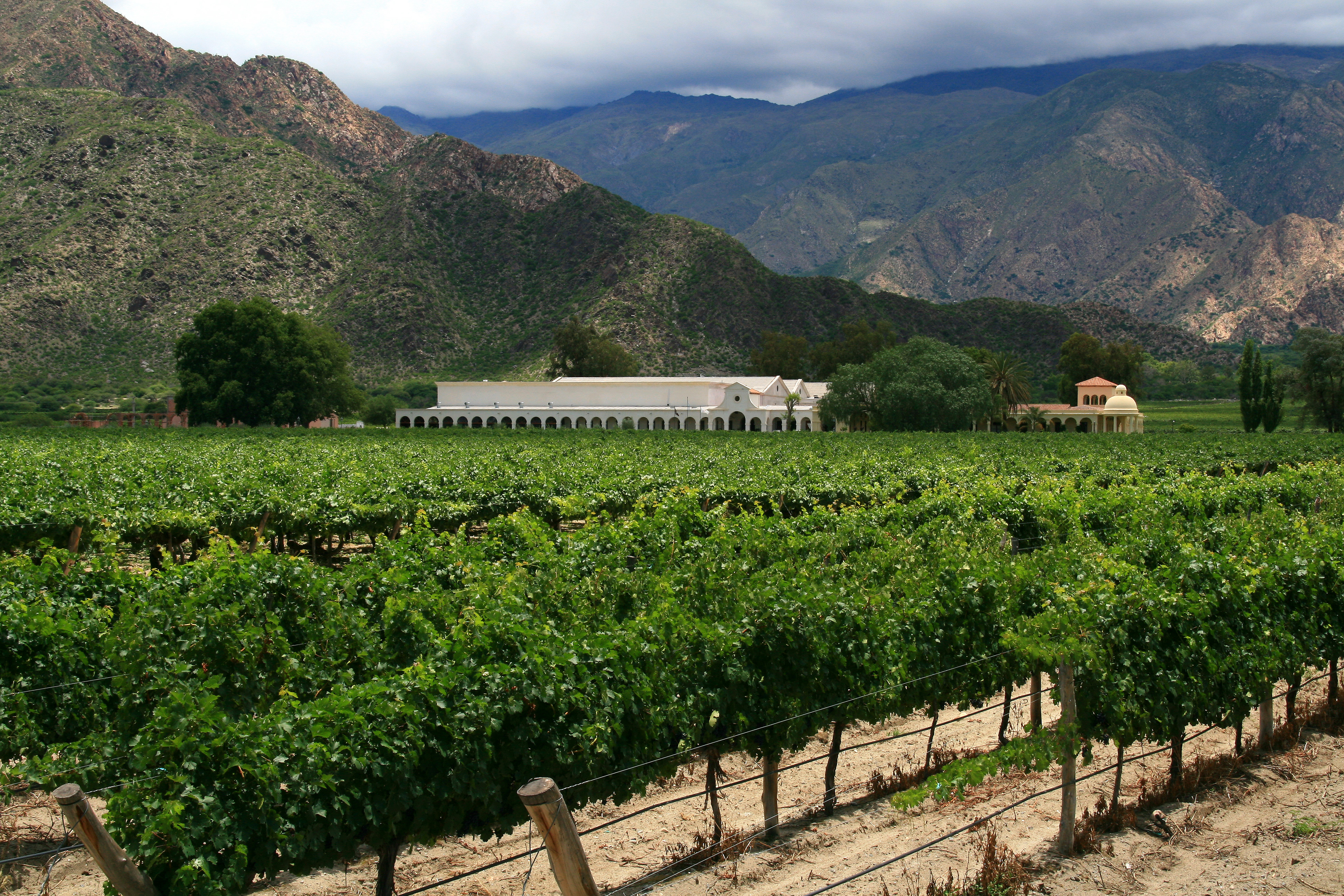
A winery set between vineyards and mountains

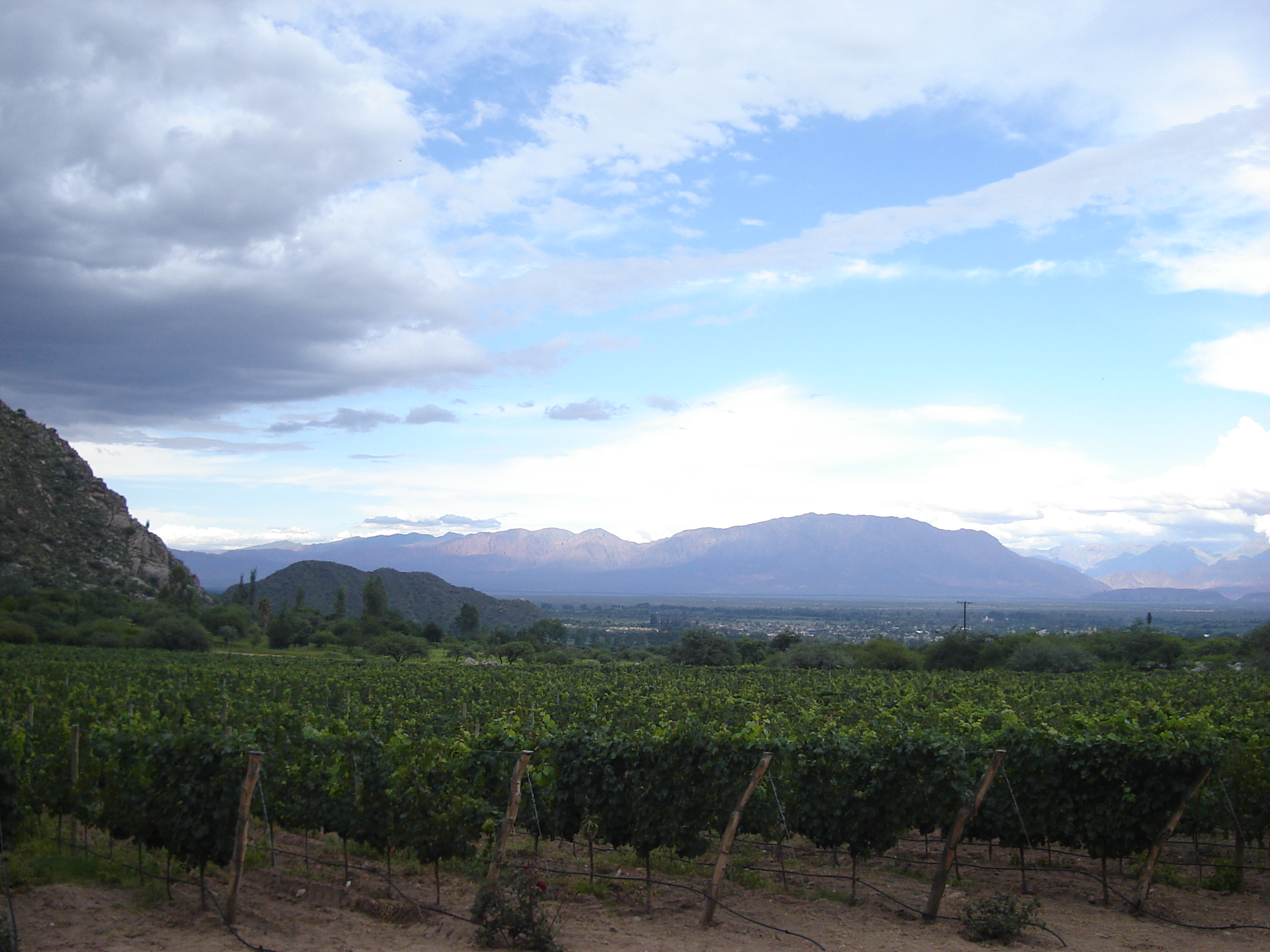
A view across the valley with vineyard in the foreground

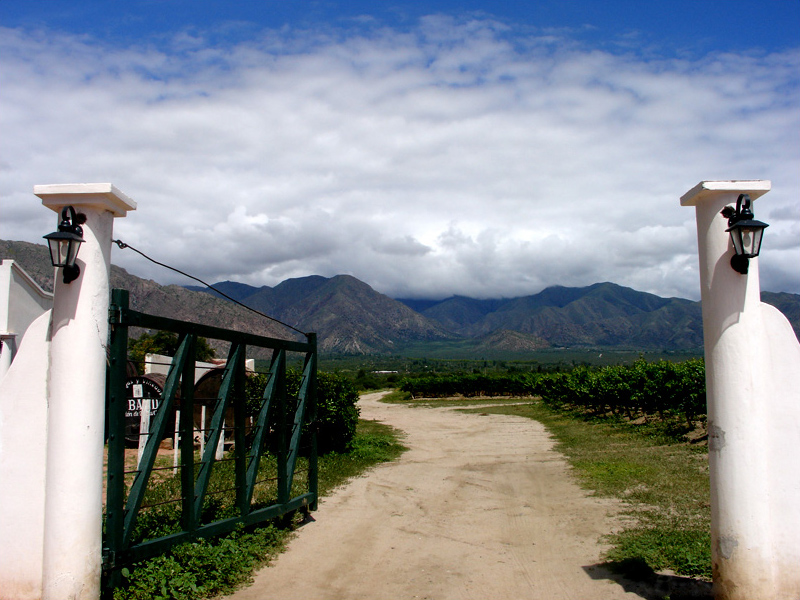
Vineyard and mountains

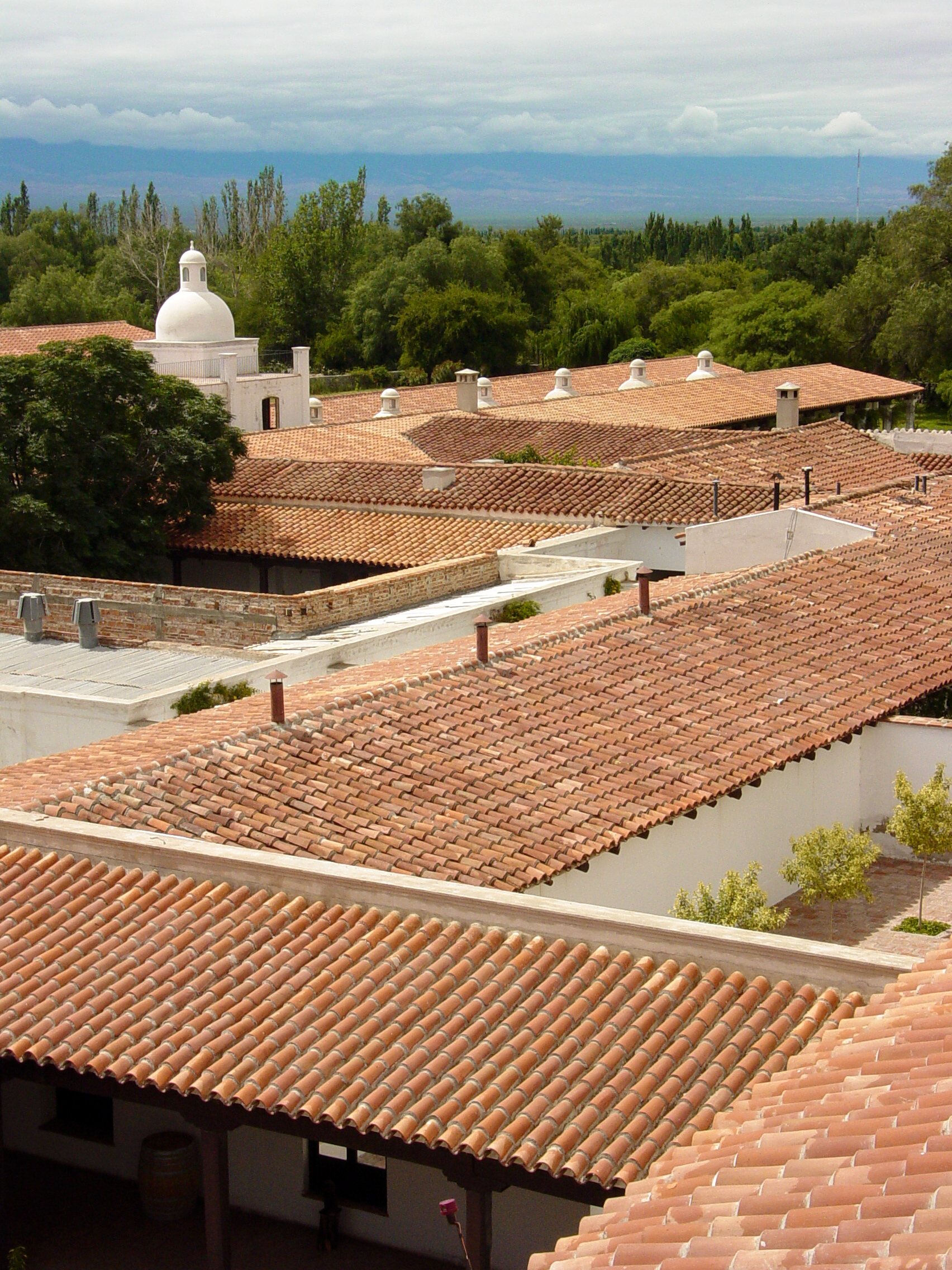
View over winery rooftops

== Valles Calchaquíes ==
Many of the most impressive sights in the Valley of the Río las Conchas (Quebrada de Cafayate) are along the paved, 183-kilometres-long National Route 68 that goes from Salta to Cafayate. National Route 40 goes for 165 kilometres from Cafayate to Cachi, another of the most visited points in the area (please note that this stretch of RN40 is not paved and should be avoided during the raining season). Other points of interest from Cafayate include Molinos, Tolombón and San Isidro ranch. The town of Cafayate is an attraction by itself, with its laid-back rhythm, colonial style, and wine cellars open to the public.

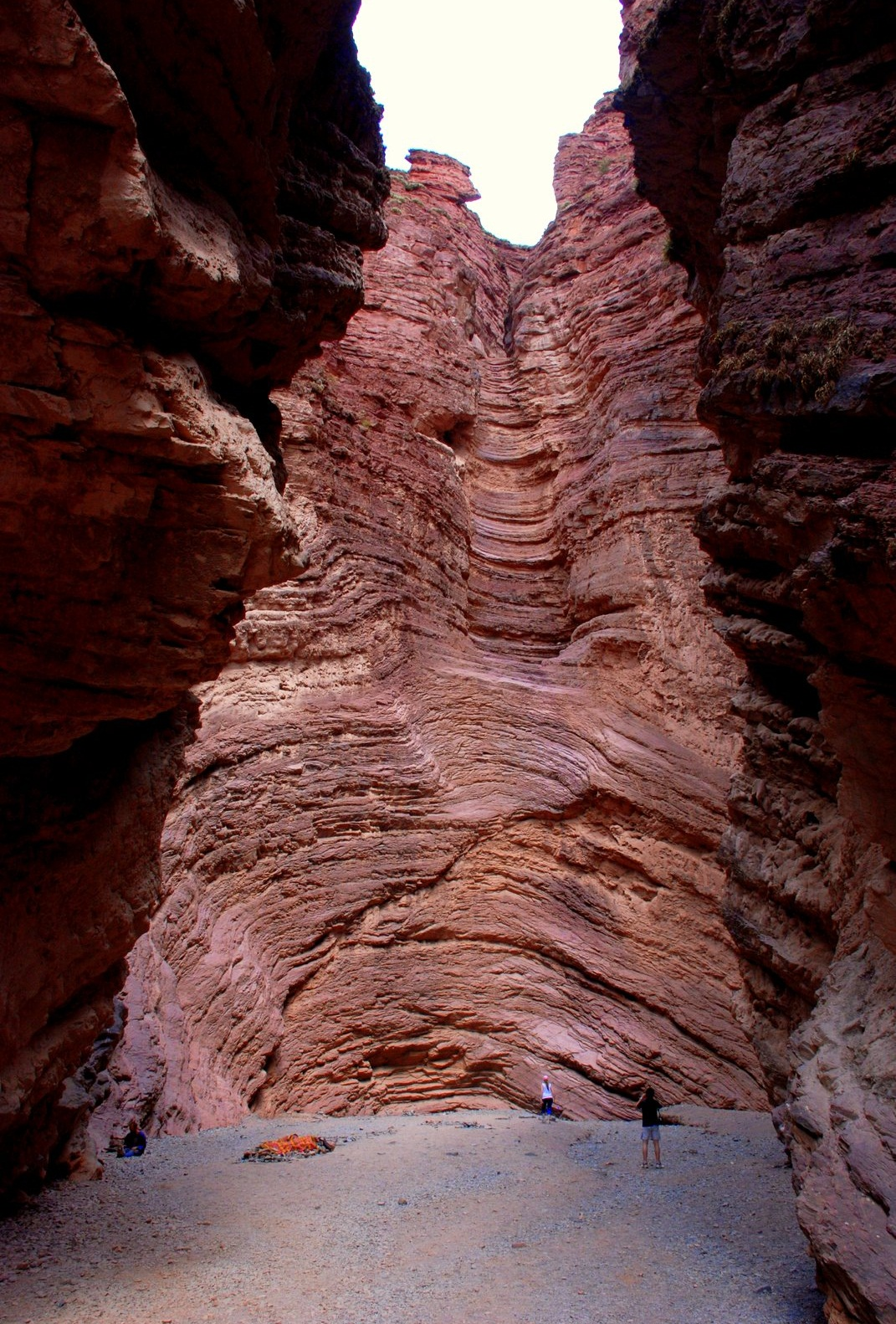
The natural Amphitheatre

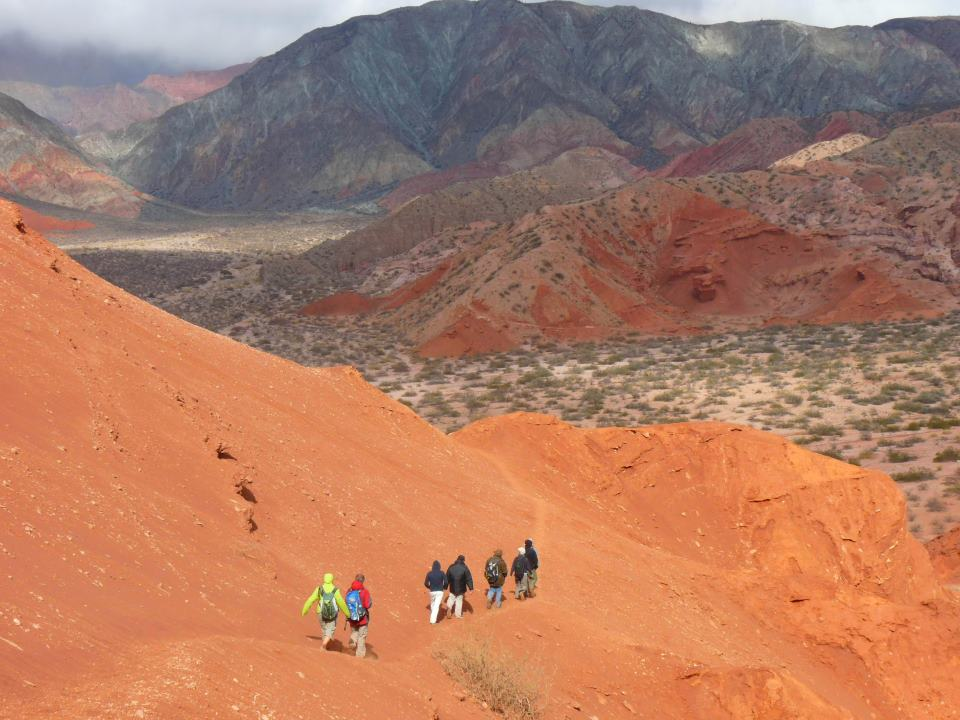
People on a Tour

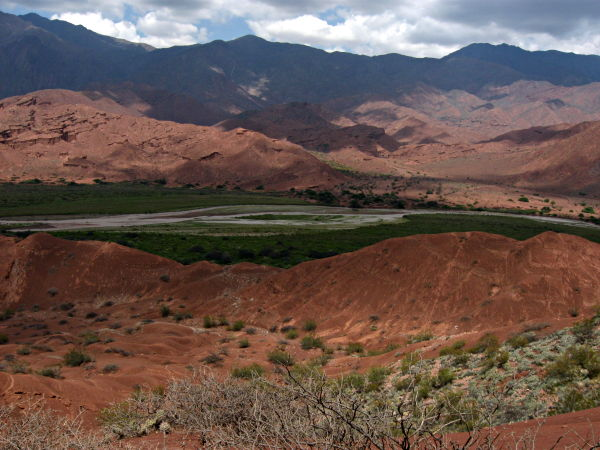
Desert river

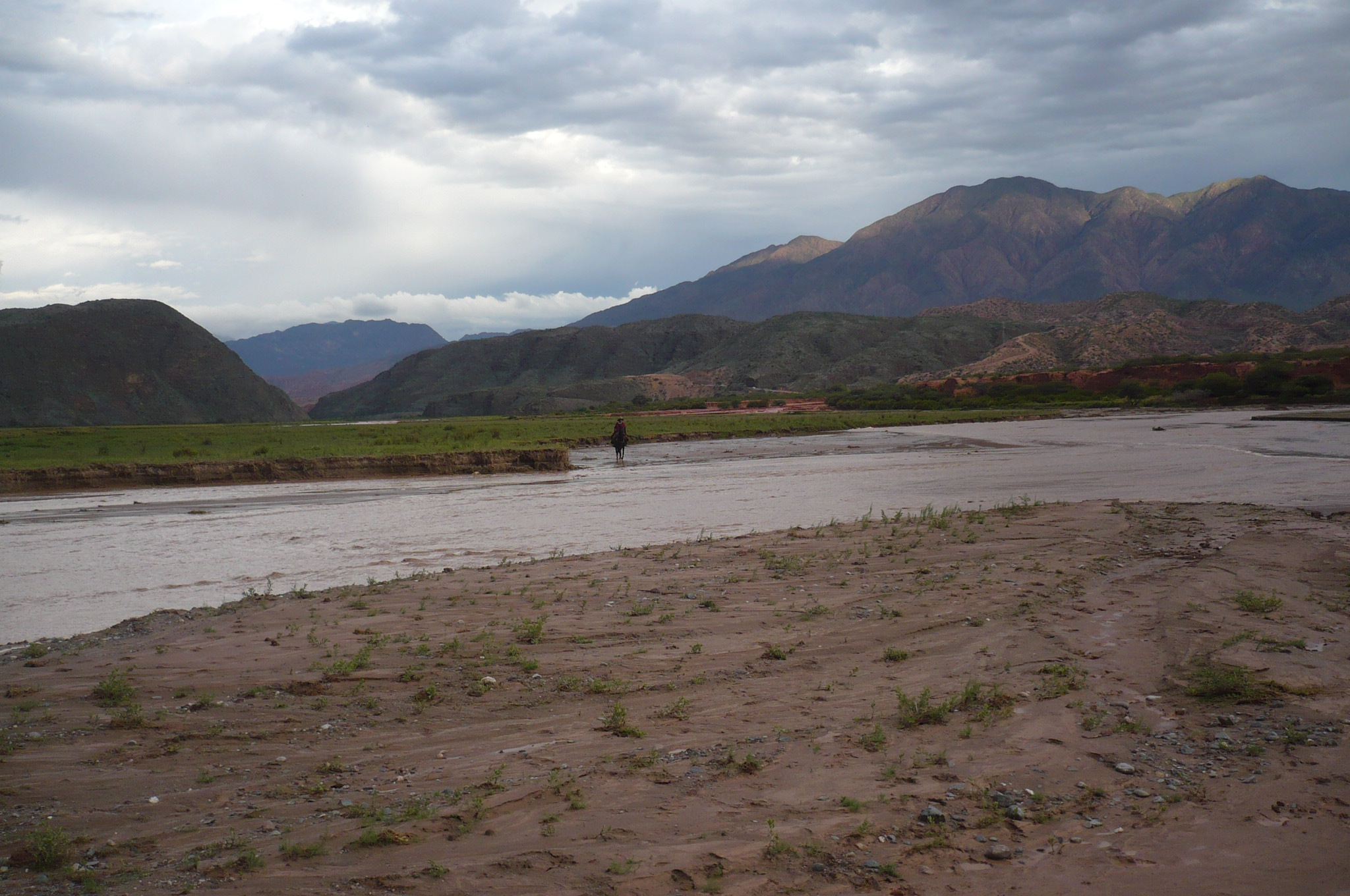
Las Juntas - Cafayate

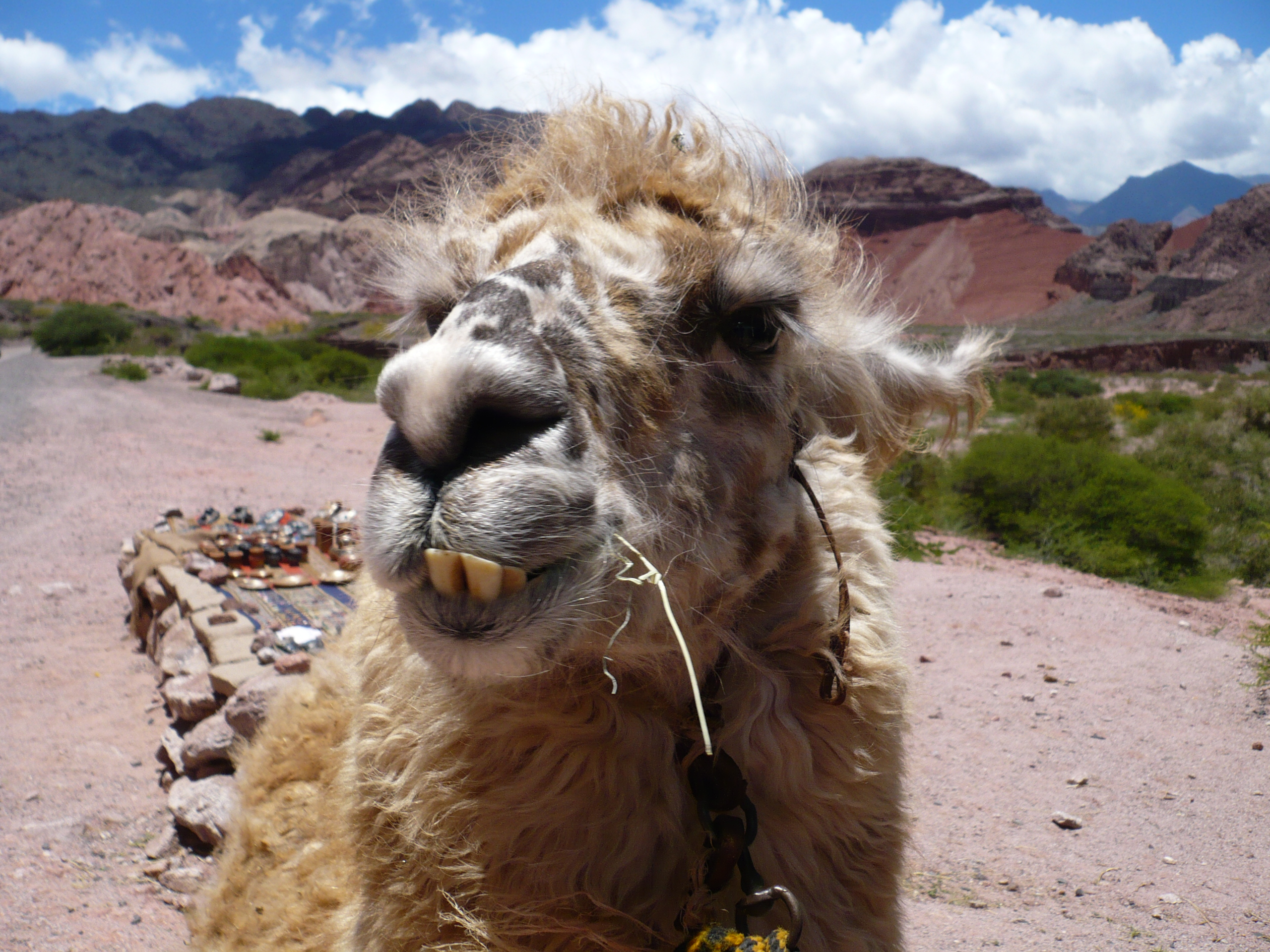
Llama
