= Molinos, Salta =

Coordinates: 25°26′20″S 66°17′35″W

Molinos
- Municipality and village
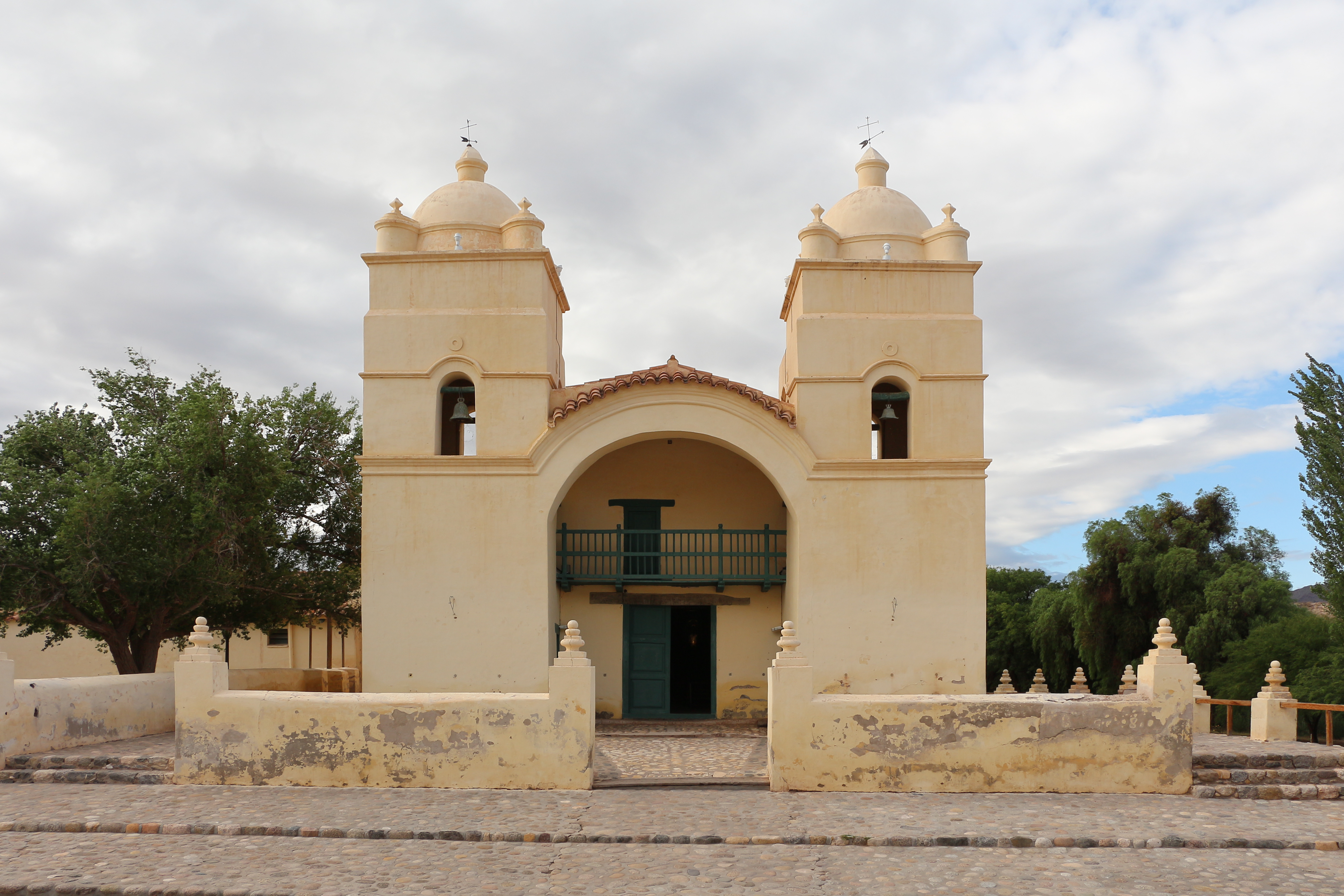
- Peter Nolasco Church
- Interactive map of Molinos
- Country: Argentina
- Province: Salta Province
- Time zone: UTC−3 (ART)
- Climate: BWk

Molinos is a village and rural municipality in Salta Province in northwestern Argentina.
