= List of cities in Argentina by population =

Ranking of local governments in Argentina by population

Satellite photograph of Greater Buenos Aires in 2022, with the Río de la Plata in the upper right. By far the country's most populous metropolitan area, it comprises the Autonomous City of Buenos Aires together with numerous surrounding districts belonging to the province of Buenos Aires.

Argentina has no uniform legal definition of a city, since each province sets its own municipal regime and its own criteria for granting city status. The National Institute of Statistics and Censuses (INDEC) conducts a national census every ten years—most recently in 2010 and 2022, the latter delayed two years by the COVID-19 pandemic—but whereas the 2010 results were published by locality (localidad), those of 2022 were released only by local government (gobierno local). Based on physical criteria, the institute defines a locality as a concentration of buildings interconnected by a network of streets or waterways, which either lies within a single local government (a simple locality) or spans several and forms an agglomeration (a compound locality). Consequently, while the 2010 data allow for rankings of the country's most populous cities—although large agglomerations are disaggregated—the 2022 data are limited to local governments, which in most provinces consist of a single settlement but in others take in several localities, both urban and rural. In four provinces the municipal division follows the so-called municipio-departamento model, in which each local government's boundaries coincide with those of a department (departamento). In Mendoza, San Juan and La Rioja, a single municipality governs an entire department and its constituent localities have no municipal government of their own, while in Buenos Aires each municipality governs a whole second-level division—there called a partido—whose localities are administered through municipal delegations. The Autonomous City of Buenos Aires, the federal capital, is a self-governing first-level jurisdiction comparable to a province, subdivided into 15 communes (comunas), each made up of one or more neighbourhoods (barrios).

The following list includes the local governments in Argentina with at least 50,000 inhabitants according to the 2022 census, along with a separate list of the most populous cities in 2010 and, further below, a ranking of the country's largest urban areas based on United Nations estimates. In the case of the federal capital, the figures shown are for the city as a whole, rather than broken down by its subdivisions. Apart from it, all the entries are municipalities, (Note: INDEC's dataset labels the city of Santiago del Estero a comisión municipal, although it assigns it the category of a first-category municipality.) although other categories—such as comunas, comisiones municipales and comisiones de fomento—exist in some provinces. Many Argentine cities extend across several local governments, producing a different ranking when urban agglomerations or metropolitan areas are considered. The most notable example is Greater Buenos Aires, which comprises the federal capital together with a large number of surrounding partidos belonging to the province of Buenos Aires. By far the country's most populous metropolitan area, it was the only one in the 2022 census with data broken down by "entity" (entidad)—a statistical category below local government that does not necessarily correspond to a localidad—and whose results are therefore presented separately. These units are not necessarily cities—a status that, in the province, is granted by law to towns that are capitals of partidos or have a minimum population and infrastructure, specifically 30,000 inhabitants in Greater Buenos Aires and Greater La Plata, and 5,000 in the rest of the province. The population shown is that of people living in private dwellings and does not include those living in collective accommodation or people who are homeless, so the figures are lower than the total.

== 2022 census ==
=== Municipalities with 50,000 or more inhabitants ===
This table lists the municipalities of Argentina with a population of at least 50,000 living in private dwellings at the time of the 2022 census. In the provinces of Buenos Aires, Mendoza, San Juan and La Rioja (where a single local government may take in more than one town), the localities making up each one are listed in a note, headed by the local government's capital (ciudad cabecera), except for the partidos of the Buenos Aires metropolitan region, whose subdivisions are given separately below.

The table displays:

1. The local government rank by population
2. The local government name
3. The province in which it lies
4. The population in private dwellings at the time of the 2022 census

| Federal capital |
| Provincial capital |
| Province's largest local government |
| Provincial capital and largest local government |

| Local government | Province | 2022 census |
|---|---|---|
| Autonomous City of Buenos Aires (Note: The Autonomous City of Buenos Aires is divided into 15 communes (comunas), which are administrative subdivisions rather than independent local governments. Their populations are added together here.) | Autonomous City of Buenos Aires | 3,095,454 |
| La Matanza | Buenos Aires | 1,837,168 |
| Córdoba | Córdoba | 1,498,060 |
| Rosario | Santa Fe | 1,030,069 |
| La Plata | Buenos Aires | 756,074 |
| Lomas de Zamora | Buenos Aires | 685,644 |
| General Pueyrredón (Note: The partido of General Pueyrredón comprises its capital, Mar del Plata, together with the census localities of Barrio El Boquerón, Barrio Santa Paula, Chapadmalal, El Marquesado and Sierra de los Padres.) | Buenos Aires | 660,569 |
| Quilmes | Buenos Aires | 631,774 |
| San Miguel de Tucumán | Tucumán | 598,835 |
| Salta | Salta | 591,113 |
| Almirante Brown | Buenos Aires | 583,209 |
| Merlo | Buenos Aires | 581,484 |
| Moreno | Buenos Aires | 575,758 |
| Florencio Varela | Buenos Aires | 488,103 |
| Lanús | Buenos Aires | 460,081 |
| Tigre | Buenos Aires | 446,291 |
| General San Martín | Buenos Aires | 444,503 |
| Corrientes | Corrientes | 428,346 |
| Santa Fe | Santa Fe | 405,264 |
| Pilar | Buenos Aires | 393,614 |
| Avellaneda | Buenos Aires | 366,117 |
| Tres de Febrero | Buenos Aires | 362,319 |
| Berazategui | Buenos Aires | 358,328 |
| Malvinas Argentinas | Buenos Aires | 349,401 |
| Esteban Echeverría | Buenos Aires | 337,880 |
| Bahía Blanca (Note: The partido of Bahía Blanca comprises its capital, Bahía Blanca, together with the census localities of Cabildo and General Daniel Cerri.) | Buenos Aires | 334,505 |
| Morón | Buenos Aires | 329,517 |
| San Miguel | Buenos Aires | 327,650 |
| Posadas | Misiones | 327,539 |
| José C. Paz | Buenos Aires | 326,527 |
| Guaymallén (Note: The department of Guaymallén comprises its capital, Villa Nueva, together with the census localities of Colonia Segovia, Guaymallén, La Primavera, Los Corralitos and Puente de Hierro.) | Mendoza | 320,871 |
| San Salvador de Jujuy | Jujuy | 310,943 |
| Santiago del Estero | Santiago del Estero | 310,201 |
| Resistencia | Chaco | 298,611 |
| San Isidro | Buenos Aires | 295,978 |
| Neuquén | Neuquén | 289,068 |
| Vicente López | Buenos Aires | 280,541 |
| Paraná | Entre Ríos | 268,941 |
| Formosa | Formosa | 263,435 |
| Escobar | Buenos Aires | 256,071 |
| Las Heras (Note: The department of Las Heras comprises its capital, Las Heras, together with the census localities of Cacheuta, Jocolí, Las Cuevas, Los Penitentes, Polvaredas, Puente del Inca, Punta de Vacas, Uspallata and Villa Clarita.) | Mendoza | 233,839 |
| Maipú (Note: The department of Maipú comprises its capital, Maipú, together with the census localities of Barrancas, Barrio 9 de Julio, Barrio Jesús de Nazaret, Cruz de Piedra, El Pedregal, Fray Luis Beltrán, Rodeo del Medio, Russell and San Roque.) | Mendoza | 218,887 |
| San Rafael (Note: The department of San Rafael comprises its capital, San Rafael, together with the census localities of 25 de Mayo, Barrio El Nevado, Barrio Empleados de Comercio, Barrio Intendencia, Capitán Montoya, Cuadro Benegas, El Nihuil, El Sosneado, El Toledano Norte, El Tropezón, Goudge, Jaime Prats, La Llave Nueva, Las Malvinas, Monte Comán, Pobre Diablo, Punta del Agua, Rama Caída, Real del Padre, Salto de las Rosas, Villa Atuel and Villa Atuel Norte.) | Mendoza | 213,204 |
| La Rioja | La Rioja | 210,507 |
| San Luis | San Luis | 206,114 |
| Comodoro Rivadavia | Chubut | 201,230 |
| Ezeiza | Buenos Aires | 198,620 |
| Godoy Cruz | Mendoza | 194,557 |
| San Fernando del Valle de Catamarca | Catamarca | 186,466 |
| Hurlingham | Buenos Aires | 185,361 |
| Río Cuarto | Córdoba | 180,724 |
| Concordia | Entre Ríos | 179,181 |
| Ituzaingó | Buenos Aires | 177,983 |
| Luján de Cuyo (Note: The department of Luján de Cuyo comprises its capital, Luján de Cuyo, together with the census localities of Agrelo, Barrio Perdriel IV, Cacheuta, Costa Flores, El Carrizal, El Salto, Las Compuertas, Las Vegas, Mayor Drummond Este, Perdriel, Potrerillos and Ugarteche.) | Mendoza | 171,883 |
| San Fernando | Buenos Aires | 171,099 |
| San Nicolás (Note: The partido of San Nicolás comprises its capital, San Nicolás de los Arroyos, together with the census localities of Conesa, Erézcano, General Rojo and Villa Esperanza.) | Buenos Aires | 166,657 |
| Tandil (Note: The partido of Tandil comprises its capital, Tandil, together with the census localities of Azucena, Barrio Cerrado La Mata, De la Canal, Fulton, Gardey, Iraola and María Ignacia.) | Buenos Aires | 144,678 |
| General Rodríguez | Buenos Aires | 142,315 |
| San Martín (Note: The department of San Martín comprises its capital, San Martín, together with the census localities of Alto Salvador, Alto Salvador Sur, Alto Verde, Barrio Chivilcoy, Barrio Emanuel, Barrio La Estación, Barrio Los Charabones, Barrio Nuestra Señora de Fátima, Barrio Nueva California Sur, Capilla San Expedito, Chapanay, Chivilcoy, El Espino, El Ramblón, Las Chimbas, Montecaseros, Nueva California and Tres Porteñas.) | Mendoza | 139,406 |
| Rawson (Note: The department of Rawson comprises its capital, Villa Krause, together with the census localities of Colonia Sarmiento, Punta del Monte, Rawson and Villa Bolaños.) | San Juan | 136,582 |
| San Carlos de Bariloche | Río Negro | 135,787 |
| Villa Mercedes | San Luis | 132,076 |
| Zárate | Buenos Aires | 131,415 |
| La Banda | Santiago del Estero | 128,601 |
| Mendoza | Mendoza | 123,715 |
| Olavarría (Note: The partido of Olavarría comprises its capital, Olavarría, together with the census localities of Blancagrande, Colonia Nievas, Colonia San Miguel, Espigas, Hinojo, Recalde, Santa Luisa, Sierra Chica and Sierras Bayas.) | Buenos Aires | 122,011 |
| Santa Rosa | La Pampa | 116,083 |
| Río Gallegos | Santa Cruz | 115,585 |
| Pergamino (Note: The partido of Pergamino comprises its capital, Pergamino, together with the census localities of Acevedo, El Socorro, Fontezuela, Guerrico, Juan A. de la Peña, La Violeta, Manuel Ocampo, Mariano Benítez, Mariano H. Alfonzo, Pinzón, Rancagua, Urquiza and Villa San José.) | Buenos Aires | 114,988 |
| San Juan (Note: INDEC lists the municipality of the city of San Juan, the provincial capital, as Capital.) | San Juan | 114,849 |
| Luján | Buenos Aires | 110,111 |
| General Roca | Río Negro | 108,891 |
| Campana | Buenos Aires | 107,976 |
| Trelew | Chubut | 106,218 |
| Cipolletti | Río Negro | 105,510 |
| Chimbas | San Juan | 103,772 |
| Puerto Madryn | Chubut | 102,155 |
| Presidente Perón | Buenos Aires | 101,994 |
| Rafaela | Santa Fe | 101,699 |
| Necochea (Note: The partido of Necochea comprises its capital, Necochea, together with the census localities of Balneario Los Ángeles, Claraz, Energía, Juan N. Fernández, Necochea – Quequén, Nicanor Olivera and Ramón Santamarina.) | Buenos Aires | 101,483 |
| Rivadavia | San Juan | 101,334 |
| Presidencia Roque Sáenz Peña | Chaco | 101,086 |
| Junín (Note: The partido of Junín comprises its capital, Junín, together with the census localities of Agustina, Agustín Roca, Fortín Tiburcio, Laplacette, Morse, Paraje La Agraria and Saforcada.) | Buenos Aires | 100,964 |
| Berisso | Buenos Aires | 100,685 |
| La Costa (Note: The partido of La Costa comprises its capital, Mar del Tuyú, together with the census localities of Costa Esmeralda, Kilómetro 314, Mar del Tuyú - Mar de Ajó - San Bernardo, Punta Médanos, San Clemente del Tuyú and Villa Robles.) | Buenos Aires | 100,400 |
| Río Grande | Tierra del Fuego | 98,475 |
| Goya | Corrientes | 98,368 |
| San Vicente | Buenos Aires | 97,929 |
| Villa María | Córdoba | 96,083 |
| San José de Gualeguaychú | Entre Ríos | 94,776 |
| Villa Gobernador Gálvez | Santa Fe | 92,147 |
| San Ramón De La Nueva Orán | Salta | 90,368 |
| Reconquista | Santa Fe | 87,986 |
| Concepción del Uruguay | Entre Ríos | 86,016 |
| Tafí Viejo | Tucumán | 85,529 |
| Venado Tuerto | Santa Fe | 82,839 |
| Yerba Buena | Tucumán | 82,125 |
| Ushuaia | Tierra del Fuego | 79,548 |
| Tartagal | Salta | 79,126 |
| Banda del Río Salí | Tucumán | 77,678 |
| Oberá | Misiones | 76,875 |
| Azul (Note: The partido of Azul comprises its capital, Azul, together with the census localities of 16 de Julio, Ariel, Cacharí, Chillar and Parish.) | Buenos Aires | 75,152 |
| Santo Tomé | Santa Fe | 75,133 |
| Eldorado | Misiones | 75,128 |
| Pocito (Note: The department of Pocito comprises its capital, Villa Aberastain, together with the census localities of Barrio Municipal, Barrio Ruta 40, Carpintería, Quinto Cuartel, Villa Aberastain - La Rinconada, Villa Barboza - Villa Nacusi and Villa Centenario.) | San Juan | 72,879 |
| San Pedro de Jujuy | Jujuy | 72,062 |
| Villa Carlos Paz | Córdoba | 71,280 |
| Mercedes (Note: The partido of Mercedes comprises its capital, Mercedes, together with the census localities of Goldney and Jorge Born.) | Buenos Aires | 71,002 |
| Chivilcoy (Note: The partido of Chivilcoy comprises its capital, Chivilcoy, together with the census localities of Benítez, Emilio Ayarza, Gorostiaga, La Rica, Moquehuá, Palemón Huergo, Ramón Biaus and San Sebastián.) | Buenos Aires | 70,554 |
| Cañuelas | Buenos Aires | 70,542 |
| Las Talitas | Tucumán | 69,583 |
| San Francisco | Córdoba | 69,065 |
| Alderetes | Tucumán | 68,363 |
| San Pedro (Note: The partido of San Pedro comprises its capital, San Pedro, together with the census localities of Gobernador Castro, Ingeniero Moneta, Obligado, Pueblo Doyle, Río Tala and Santa Lucía.) | Buenos Aires | 68,353 |
| General Pico | La Pampa | 67,138 |
| Coronel de Marina Leonardo Rosales (Note: The partido of Coronel de Marina Leonardo Rosales comprises its capital, Punta Alta, together with the census localities of Bajo Hondo, Calderón and Pehuen Có.) | Buenos Aires | 65,823 |
| Palpala | Jujuy | 65,522 |
| Marcos Paz | Buenos Aires | 64,761 |
| Ensenada | Buenos Aires | 63,978 |
| Rivadavia (Note: The department of Rivadavia comprises its capital, Rivadavia, together with the census localities of Andrade, Barrio Cooperativa Eléctrica, Barrio Cooperativa Los Campamentos, Barrio Cooperativa Reducción, Barrio Rivadavia, El Mirador, La Central, La Esperanza, La Florida, La Libertad, Los Campamentos, Los Árboles, Medrano, Mundo Nuevo, Reducción de Abajo and Santa María de Oro.) | Mendoza | 63,589 |
| Garupá | Misiones | 63,439 |
| Santa Lucía | San Juan | 62,697 |
| Tres Arroyos (Note: The partido of Tres Arroyos comprises its capital, Tres Arroyos, together with the census localities of Balneario Orense, Claromecó, Copetonas, Micaela Cascallares, Orense, Reta, San Francisco de Bellocq, San Mayol and Villa Rodríguez.) | Buenos Aires | 61,889 |
| Perico | Jujuy | 61,314 |
| Alta Gracia | Córdoba | 60,417 |
| Viedma | Río Negro | 60,267 |
| Tunuyán (Note: The department of Tunuyán comprises its capital, Tunuyán, together with the census localities of Barrio San Cayetano, Campo Los Andes, Colonia Las Rosas, El Algarrobo, El Manzano, La Riojita, Los Sauces, Villa Arroyo Grande, Villa Seca and Vista Flores.) | Mendoza | 59,972 |
| Clorinda | Formosa | 59,935 |
| Barranqueras | Chaco | 59,655 |
| Chilecito (Note: The department of Chilecito comprises its capital, Chilecito, together with the census localities of Colonia Anguinán, Colonia Malligasta, Colonia Vichigasta, Guanchín, Malligasta, Miranda, Nonogasta, San Nicolás, Santa Florentina, Sañogasta, Tilimuqui and Vichigasta.) | La Rioja | 58,681 |
| Concepción | Tucumán | 57,834 |
| Caleta Olivia | Santa Cruz | 56,310 |
| Puerto Iguazú | Misiones | 54,680 |
| Paso de los Libres | Corrientes | 53,761 |
| Río Tercero | Córdoba | 53,228 |
| Villa Constitución | Santa Fe | 52,576 |
| Chacabuco (Note: The partido of Chacabuco comprises its capital, Chacabuco, together with the census localities of Castilla, Los Ángeles, O' Higgins and Rawson.) | Buenos Aires | 52,409 |
| General Alvear (Note: The department of General Alvear comprises its capital, General Alvear, together with the census localities of Bowen, Canalejas, Carmensa, El Ceibo and Los Compartos.) | Mendoza | 52,379 |
| Plottier | Neuquén | 52,370 |
| 9 de Julio (Note: The partido of 9 de Julio comprises its capital, 9 de Julio, together with the census localities of 12 de Octubre, Carlos María Naón, Dennehy, Dudignac, Facundo Quiroga, French, La Niña, Morea, Norumbega and Patricios.) | Buenos Aires | 52,366 |
| San Lorenzo | Santa Fe | 50,942 |

=== Subdivisions of the Buenos Aires metropolitan region ===
For the Buenos Aires metropolitan region, INDEC published the 2022 population of each local government broken down into smaller units, which it does not do for the rest of the country. (Note: INDEC divides the continuous built-up area of the metropolitan region into "entities" (entidades), defined as subdivisions of a single compound census locality, and "localities" (localidades) for towns detached from that built-up area. These units are not independent local governments, and a city in everyday usage may span several of them; the figures are not directly comparable with those in the main table.) The following table lists the 99 entities and localities of the Buenos Aires Province partidos of the metropolitan region with at least 50,000 inhabitants living in private dwellings at the 2022 census. The Autonomous City of Buenos Aires, whose internal subdivisions are barrios rather than localities, is excluded.

| Subdivision | Partido | Type | 2022 census |
|---|---|---|---|
| José C. Paz | José C. Paz | Entity | 295,236 |
| Merlo | Merlo | Entity | 289,536 |
| González Catán | La Matanza | Entity | 287,036 |
| Gregorio de Laferrere | La Matanza | Entity | 253,993 |
| Casco Urbano | La Plata | Entity | 218,815 |
| Virrey del Pino | La Matanza | Entity | 207,478 |
| Rafael Castillo | La Matanza | Entity | 187,922 |
| Isidro Casanova | La Matanza | Entity | 171,820 |
| Monte Grande | Esteban Echeverría | Entity | 161,647 |
| Lanús Oeste | Lanús | Entity | 158,517 |
| Quilmes Oeste | Quilmes | Entity | 148,915 |
| San Juan Bautista | Florencio Varela | Entity | 144,484 |
| Quilmes | Quilmes | Entity | 137,688 |
| General Rodríguez | General Rodríguez | Entity | 132,385 |
| Trujui | Moreno | Entity | 131,155 |
| Santa María | San Miguel | Entity | 128,064 |
| San Justo | La Matanza | Entity | 118,999 |
| Libertad | Merlo | Entity | 117,049 |
| Ituzaingó Centro | Ituzaingó | Entity | 111,749 |
| Castelar | Morón | Entity | 110,684 |
| Zárate | Zárate | Entity | 109,443 |
| Ramos Mejía | La Matanza | Entity | 109,081 |
| Morón | Morón | Entity | 101,615 |
| Berazategui | Berazategui | Entity | 101,555 |
| Caseros | Tres de Febrero | Entity | 98,221 |
| Campana | Campana | Entity | 97,991 |
| La Tablada | La Matanza | Entity | 97,729 |
| Villa Celina | La Matanza | Entity | 94,812 |
| Bella Vista | San Miguel | Entity | 94,048 |
| Guernica | Presidente Perón | Entity | 94,004 |
| Burzaco | Almirante Brown | Entity | 92,915 |
| Moreno Norte | Moreno | Entity | 92,777 |
| Ciudad Evita | La Matanza | Entity | 91,492 |
| Belén de Escobar | Escobar | Entity | 91,292 |
| Bernal Oeste | Quilmes | Entity | 89,404 |
| Grand Bourg | Malvinas Argentinas | Entity | 88,891 |
| Berazategui Oeste | Berazategui | Entity | 88,605 |
| Wilde | Avellaneda | Entity | 87,414 |
| Luján | Luján | Entity | 86,653 |
| Mariano Acosta | Merlo | Entity | 85,341 |
| Monte Chingolo | Lanús | Entity | 84,576 |
| Villa Luzuriaga | La Matanza | Entity | 84,410 |
| Lomas de Zamora | Lomas de Zamora | Entity | 83,826 |
| Remedios de Escalada de San Martín | Lanús | Entity | 81,229 |
| Cuartel V | Moreno | Entity | 80,989 |
| Gobernador Julio A. Costa | Florencio Varela | Entity | 80,740 |
| Glew | Almirante Brown | Entity | 79,686 |
| San Fernando | San Fernando | Entity | 79,347 |
| Olivos | Vicente López | Entity | 77,296 |
| Garín | Escobar | Entity | 76,722 |
| Boulogne Sur Mer | San Isidro | Entity | 76,254 |
| Bosques | Florencio Varela | Entity | 75,463 |
| Los Hornos | La Plata | Entity | 74,726 |
| Ciudad Jardín El Libertador | General San Martín | Entity | 74,115 |
| Don Torcuato | Tigre | Entity | 73,610 |
| Ciudadela | Tres de Febrero | Entity | 71,681 |
| Villa Elvira | La Plata | Entity | 70,558 |
| Villa Santos Tesei | Hurlingham | Entity | 68,947 |
| San Miguel | San Miguel | Entity | 68,129 |
| Tigre | Tigre | Entity | 67,543 |
| Moreno Sur | Moreno | Entity | 67,172 |
| Martínez | San Isidro | Entity | 64,978 |
| Ezpeleta | Quilmes | Entity | 64,488 |
| La Reja | Moreno | Entity | 64,338 |
| Beccar | San Isidro | Entity | 63,719 |
| San Francisco Solano | Quilmes | Entity | 63,684 |
| Presidente Derqui | Pilar | Entity | 63,325 |
| Los Polvorines | Malvinas Argentinas | Entity | 63,293 |
| Guillermo Enrique Hudson | Berazategui | Entity | 63,074 |
| San José | Lomas de Zamora | Entity | 62,079 |
| Hurlingham | Hurlingham | Entity | 62,040 |
| Benavídez | Tigre | Entity | 61,974 |
| Villa Domínico | Avellaneda | Entity | 61,835 |
| 9 de Abril | Esteban Echeverría | Entity | 61,594 |
| Marcos Paz | Marcos Paz | Locality | 61,494 |
| Banfield | Lomas de Zamora | Entity | 61,072 |
| Lomas del Mirador | La Matanza | Entity | 60,675 |
| Temperley | Lomas de Zamora | Entity | 59,899 |
| Rafael Calzada | Almirante Brown | Entity | 59,696 |
| El Palomar | Morón | Entity | 59,232 |
| Santa Catarina | Lomas de Zamora | Entity | 58,833 |
| Del Viso | Pilar | Entity | 58,572 |
| Villa Fiorito | Lomas de Zamora | Entity | 58,060 |
| San Carlos | La Plata | Entity | 57,727 |
| Lanús Este | Lanús | Entity | 57,306 |
| General Pacheco | Tigre | Entity | 57,183 |
| El Jagüel | Esteban Echeverría | Entity | 57,080 |
| Paso del Rey | Moreno | Entity | 56,722 |
| Longchamps | Almirante Brown | Entity | 56,379 |
| William C. Morris | Hurlingham | Entity | 54,374 |
| Avellaneda | Avellaneda | Entity | 54,057 |
| Tristán Suárez | Ezeiza | Entity | 53,168 |
| San José | Almirante Brown | Entity | 51,942 |
| Pilar | Pilar | Entity | 51,703 |
| Ingeniero Pablo Nogués | Malvinas Argentinas | Entity | 51,614 |
| Alejandro Korn | San Vicente | Entity | 51,068 |
| Ingeniero Budge | Lomas de Zamora | Entity | 50,735 |
| Pontevedra | Merlo | Entity | 50,636 |
| Santa Albertina | Lomas de Zamora | Entity | 50,036 |

== 2010 census ==
At the 2010 census INDEC published population by locality, allowing a ranking of the country's most populous cities. The following table lists the census localities with at least 50,000 inhabitants. The figure is the total resident population, and is therefore not directly comparable with the private-dwelling figures of the 2022 table above. In the urban agglomerations of Greater Buenos Aires, Greater Mendoza and Greater San Juan, INDEC records the continuous built-up area as a single compound locality divided into components named after each partido (in Buenos Aires) or department (elsewhere); these appear in the table under the name of their partido or department rather than as individual cities.

| Federal capital |
| Provincial capital |
| Province's largest entry |
| Provincial capital and largest entry |

| Locality | Province | 2010 census |
|---|---|---|
| Autonomous City of Buenos Aires | Autonomous City of Buenos Aires | 2,890,151 |
| La Matanza | Buenos Aires | 1,775,272 |
| Córdoba | Córdoba | 1,317,298 |
| Rosario | Santa Fe | 948,312 |
| La Plata | Buenos Aires | 643,133 |
| Lomas de Zamora | Buenos Aires | 616,279 |
| Mar del Plata | Buenos Aires | 593,337 |
| Quilmes | Buenos Aires | 582,943 |
| Almirante Brown | Buenos Aires | 552,139 |
| San Miguel de Tucumán | Tucumán | 548,866 |
| Merlo | Buenos Aires | 527,658 |
| Salta | Salta | 520,683 |
| Lanús | Buenos Aires | 459,263 |
| Moreno | Buenos Aires | 452,505 |
| Florencio Varela | Buenos Aires | 426,005 |
| General San Martín | Buenos Aires | 414,196 |
| Santa Fe | Santa Fe | 391,164 |
| Tigre | Buenos Aires | 370,913 |
| Corrientes | Corrientes | 346,334 |
| Avellaneda | Buenos Aires | 342,677 |
| Tres de Febrero | Buenos Aires | 340,071 |
| Berazategui | Buenos Aires | 324,156 |
| Malvinas Argentinas | Buenos Aires | 322,375 |
| Morón | Buenos Aires | 321,109 |
| Esteban Echeverría | Buenos Aires | 300,745 |
| Pilar | Buenos Aires | 296,826 |
| San Isidro | Buenos Aires | 292,878 |
| Bahía Blanca | Buenos Aires | 291,327 |
| Resistencia | Chaco | 290,723 |
| San Miguel | Buenos Aires | 276,190 |
| Posadas | Misiones | 275,028 |
| Vicente López | Buenos Aires | 269,420 |
| José C. Paz | Buenos Aires | 265,981 |
| San Salvador de Jujuy | Jujuy | 257,970 |
| Guaymallén | Mendoza | 252,618 |
| Santiago del Estero | Santiago del Estero | 252,192 |
| Paraná | Entre Ríos | 247,139 |
| Neuquén | Neuquén | 231,198 |
| Formosa | Formosa | 222,226 |
| Escobar | Buenos Aires | 212,208 |
| Godoy Cruz | Mendoza | 191,299 |
| Las Heras | Mendoza | 189,067 |
| Hurlingham | Buenos Aires | 181,241 |
| La Rioja | La Rioja | 178,872 |
| Comodoro Rivadavia | Chubut | 175,196 |
| San Luis | San Luis | 169,947 |
| Ituzaingó | Buenos Aires | 167,824 |
| Ezeiza | Buenos Aires | 162,475 |
| San Fernando | Buenos Aires | 160,284 |
| San Fernando del Valle de Catamarca | Catamarca | 159,139 |
| Río Cuarto | Córdoba | 157,010 |
| Concordia | Entre Ríos | 149,450 |
| San Nicolás de los Arroyos | Buenos Aires | 133,602 |
| San Rafael | Mendoza | 118,009 |
| Tandil | Buenos Aires | 116,916 |
| Mendoza | Mendoza | 114,893 |
| Villa Mercedes | San Luis | 111,391 |
| Rawson | San Juan | 109,424 |
| San Carlos de Bariloche | Río Negro | 109,305 |
| San Juan | San Juan | 109,123 |
| Maipú | Mendoza | 106,662 |
| La Banda | Santiago del Estero | 106,441 |
| Santa Rosa | La Pampa | 102,860 |
| Zárate | Buenos Aires | 98,522 |
| Trelew | Chubut | 97,915 |
| Luján | Buenos Aires | 97,363 |
| Río Gallegos | Santa Cruz | 95,796 |
| Rafaela | Santa Fe | 91,571 |
| Pergamino | Buenos Aires | 91,399 |
| Presidencia Roque Sáenz Peña | Chaco | 89,882 |
| Olavarría | Buenos Aires | 89,721 |
| Berisso | Buenos Aires | 87,698 |
| Junín | Buenos Aires | 87,509 |
| Chimbas | San Juan | 87,258 |
| Campana | Buenos Aires | 86,860 |
| General Rodríguez | Buenos Aires | 85,315 |
| Necochea - Quequén | Buenos Aires | 84,784 |
| Luján de Cuyo | Mendoza | 82,615 |
| Rivadavia | San Juan | 82,582 |
| General Roca | Río Negro | 81,534 |
| Puerto Madryn | Chubut | 81,315 |
| Presidente Perón | Buenos Aires | 80,824 |
| Villa Gobernador Gálvez | Santa Fe | 80,769 |
| Gualeguaychú | Entre Ríos | 80,614 |
| San Martín | Mendoza | 79,476 |
| Villa María | Córdoba | 79,351 |
| Cipolletti | Río Negro | 77,713 |
| San Ramón De La Nueva Orán | Salta | 76,070 |
| Venado Tuerto | Santa Fe | 75,437 |
| Concepción del Uruguay | Entre Ríos | 72,528 |
| Goya | Corrientes | 71,606 |
| Reconquista | Santa Fe | 70,549 |
| Río Grande | Tierra del Fuego | 66,475 |
| Santo Tomé | Santa Fe | 65,684 |
| Oberá | Misiones | 63,960 |
| Banda del Río Salí | Tucumán | 63,226 |
| Tartagal | Salta | 63,196 |
| Villa Carlos Paz | Córdoba | 62,423 |
| San Francisco | Córdoba | 61,750 |
| San Pedro | Jujuy | 59,131 |
| Punta Alta | Buenos Aires | 58,315 |
| San Vicente | Buenos Aires | 58,165 |
| Chivilcoy | Buenos Aires | 58,152 |
| Yerba Buena - Marcos Paz | Tucumán | 57,392 |
| Eldorado | Misiones | 57,323 |
| General Pico | La Pampa | 56,795 |
| Ushuaia | Tierra del Fuego | 56,593 |
| Ensenada | Buenos Aires | 56,463 |
| Mercedes | Buenos Aires | 56,116 |
| Azul | Buenos Aires | 55,728 |
| Barranqueras | Chaco | 54,698 |
| Villa Mariano Moreno - El Colmenar | Tucumán | 52,960 |
| Clorinda | Formosa | 52,837 |
| Viedma | Río Negro | 52,789 |
| Caleta Olivia | Santa Cruz | 51,733 |
| Marcos Paz | Buenos Aires | 50,460 |
| Palpala | Jujuy | 50,183 |

== Largest urban areas (United Nations estimates) ==
The following table lists Argentina's largest urban areas as estimated by the United Nations, which applies a grid-based degree-of-urbanisation definition harmonised across countries. Each area is labelled by its principal city, but the figures cover the whole contiguous urban agglomeration (shown in parentheses where a distinct article exists), so they are modelled estimates rather than census results and use boundaries that differ from INDEC's; they are not directly comparable with the census-based tables above. For each urban area the table gives the 2025 estimate, the 2015 estimate and the percentage change between them; areas that did not reach 50,000 inhabitants in 2015 have no earlier figure.

| Federal capital |
| Provincial capital |
| Province's largest urban area |
| Provincial capital and largest urban area |

| Urban area | Province | 2025 estimate | 2015 estimate | % change |
|---|---|---|---|---|
| Buenos Aires (Greater Buenos Aires) | CABA–Buenos Aires | 14,017,736 | 13,767,054 | +1.82% |
| Córdoba (Greater Córdoba) | Córdoba | 1,460,491 | 1,413,900 | +3.30% |
| Rosario (Greater Rosario) | Santa Fe | 1,151,717 | 1,078,203 | +6.82% |
| Mendoza (Greater Mendoza) | Mendoza | 1,027,849 | 942,231 | +9.09% |
| San Miguel de Tucumán (Greater San Miguel de Tucumán) | Tucumán | 959,565 | 888,843 | +7.96% |
| La Plata (Greater La Plata) | Buenos Aires | 742,952 | 704,811 | +5.41% |
| Mar del Plata | Buenos Aires | 614,979 | 589,441 | +4.33% |
| Salta (Greater Salta) | Salta | 613,956 | 545,058 | +12.64% |
| San Juan (Greater San Juan) | San Juan | 464,466 | 438,830 | +5.84% |
| Resistencia (Greater Resistencia) | Chaco | 406,337 | 388,358 | +4.63% |
| Santiago del Estero (Santiago del Estero-La Banda) | Santiago del Estero | 393,257 | 364,204 | +7.98% |
| Corrientes (Greater Corrientes) | Corrientes | 392,082 | 370,566 | +5.81% |
| Posadas (Greater Posadas) | Misiones | 375,741 | 343,210 | +9.48% |
| Santa Fe (Greater Santa Fe) | Santa Fe | 366,960 | 351,525 | +4.39% |
| San Salvador de Jujuy (Greater San Salvador de Jujuy) | Jujuy | 274,625 | 249,239 | +10.19% |
| Bahía Blanca (Greater Bahía Blanca) | Buenos Aires | 257,379 | 253,057 | +1.71% |
| Formosa | Formosa | 229,877 | 169,643 | +35.51% |
| Neuquén | Neuquén | 223,753 | 200,469 | +11.61% |
| La Rioja | La Rioja | 216,511 | 179,102 | +20.89% |
| Paraná (Greater Paraná) | Entre Ríos | 211,110 | 207,982 | +1.50% |
| San Fernando del Valle de Catamarca (Greater San Fernando del Valle de Catamarca) | Catamarca | 203,169 | 184,137 | +10.34% |
| San Luis (Greater San Luis) | San Luis | 183,176 | 167,458 | +9.39% |
| Comodoro Rivadavia (Comodoro Rivadavia metropolitan area) | Chubut | 152,431 | 129,658 | +17.56% |
| Río Cuarto | Córdoba | 145,907 | 139,911 | +4.29% |
| San Nicolás de los Arroyos | Buenos Aires | 140,033 | 127,374 | +9.94% |
| Concordia | Entre Ríos | 138,927 | 134,002 | +3.68% |
| Río Gallegos | Santa Cruz | 130,981 | 103,606 | +26.42% |
| San Rafel | Mendoza | 120,677 | 111,655 | +8.08% |
| Santa Rosa (Greater Santa Rosa) | La Pampa | 117,603 | 107,635 | +9.26% |
| Tandil | Buenos Aires | 116,044 | 109,137 | +6.33% |
| San Carlos de Bariloche | Río Negro | 112,480 | 99,226 | +13.36% |
| Villa Mercedes | San Luis | 110,812 | 87,951 | +25.99% |
| Reconquista | Santa Fe | 108,032 | 100,742 | +7.24% |
| Trelew | Chubut | 107,895 | 96,867 | +11.38% |
| Puerto Madryn | Chubut | 97,794 | 84,847 | +15.26% |
| Presidencia Roque Sáenz Peña | Chaco | 93,107 | 88,313 | +5.43% |
| Villa María | Córdoba | 91,753 | 87,317 | +5.08% |
| San Ramón de la Nueva Orán | Salta | 91,740 | 84,668 | +8.35% |
| Pergamino | Buenos Aires | 89,220 | 84,456 | +5.64% |
| General Roca | Río Negro | 87,438 | 79,765 | +9.62% |
| Zárate | Buenos Aires | 85,413 | 75,451 | +13.20% |
| Rafaela | Santa Fe | 82,587 | 75,645 | +9.18% |
| Junín | Buenos Aires | 81,397 | 76,219 | +6.79% |
| Olavarría | Buenos Aires | 81,122 | 74,039 | +9.57% |
| Cipolletti | Río Negro | 80,813 | 71,758 | +12.62% |
| Santo Tomé | Santa Fe | 80,759 | 72,578 | +11.27% |
| San Martín (San Martín-La Colonia) | Mendoza | 80,505 | 73,031 | +10.23% |
| Oberá | Misiones | 79,852 | 73,727 | +8.31% |
| Ushuaia | Tierra del Fuego | 76,682 | 60,659 | +26.41% |
| Necochea (Necochea-Quequén) | Buenos Aires | 76,511 | 72,037 | +6.21% |
| Funes | Santa Fe | 75,091 | 58,152 | +29.13% |
| Goya | Corrientes | 74,741 | 72,158 | +3.58% |
| Viedma | Río Negro | 73,305 | 66,996 | +9.42% |
| Palpalá | Jujuy | 72,298 | 60,351 | +19.80% |
| Villa Carlos Paz | Córdoba | 71,509 | 67,686 | +5.65% |
| Río Grande | Tierra del Fuego | 70,363 | 57,882 | +21.56% |
| San Pedro de Jujuy | Jujuy | 69,606 | 60,371 | +15.30% |
| Eldorado | Misiones | 67,546 | 62,179 | +8.63% |
| Luján | Buenos Aires | 65,691 | 64,397 | +2.01% |
| Venado Tuerto | Santa Fe | 64,223 | 62,665 | +2.49% |
| Belén de Escobar | Buenos Aires | 62,212 | 58,910 | +5.61% |
| San Lorenzo | Santa Fe | 62,021 | — | — |
| Gualeguaychú | Entre Ríos | 61,376 | 59,812 | +2.61% |
| Campana | Buenos Aires | 59,829 | 58,952 | +1.49% |
| Concepción | Tucumán | 58,112 | 55,222 | +5.23% |
| San Francisco | Córdoba | 57,782 | 54,017 | +6.97% |
| Caleta Olivia | Santa Cruz | 57,583 | — | — |
| Cutral Có (Cutral Có-Plaza Huincul) | Neuquén | 57,372 | 51,143 | +12.18% |
| General Pico | La Pampa | 55,563 | 52,464 | +5.91% |
| Libertador General San Martín | Jujuy | 55,549 | — | — |
| Puerto Iguazú | Misiones | 54,306 | — | — |
| Azul | Buenos Aires | 53,193 | 50,294 | +5.76% |
| Tartagal | Salta | 52,941 | — | — |
| Chivilcoy | Buenos Aires | 52,824 | 50,493 | +4.62% |
| Concepción del Uruguay | Entre Ríos | 52,170 | — | — |
| Ingeniero Juan Allan | Buenos Aires | 50,965 | — | — |

== Gallery of urban areas ==
1. Buenos Aires (Greater Buenos Aires)

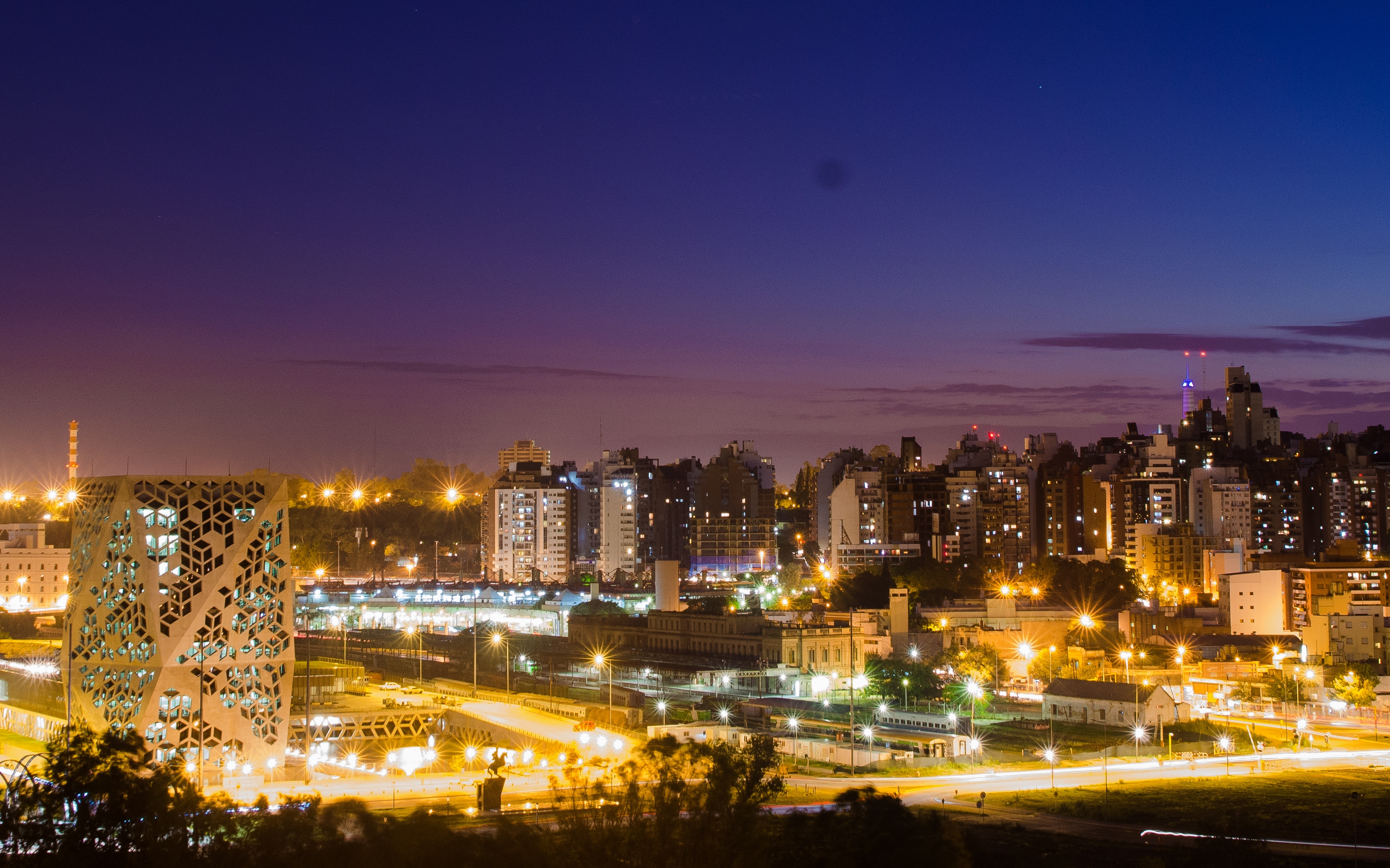
2. Córdoba (Greater Córdoba)

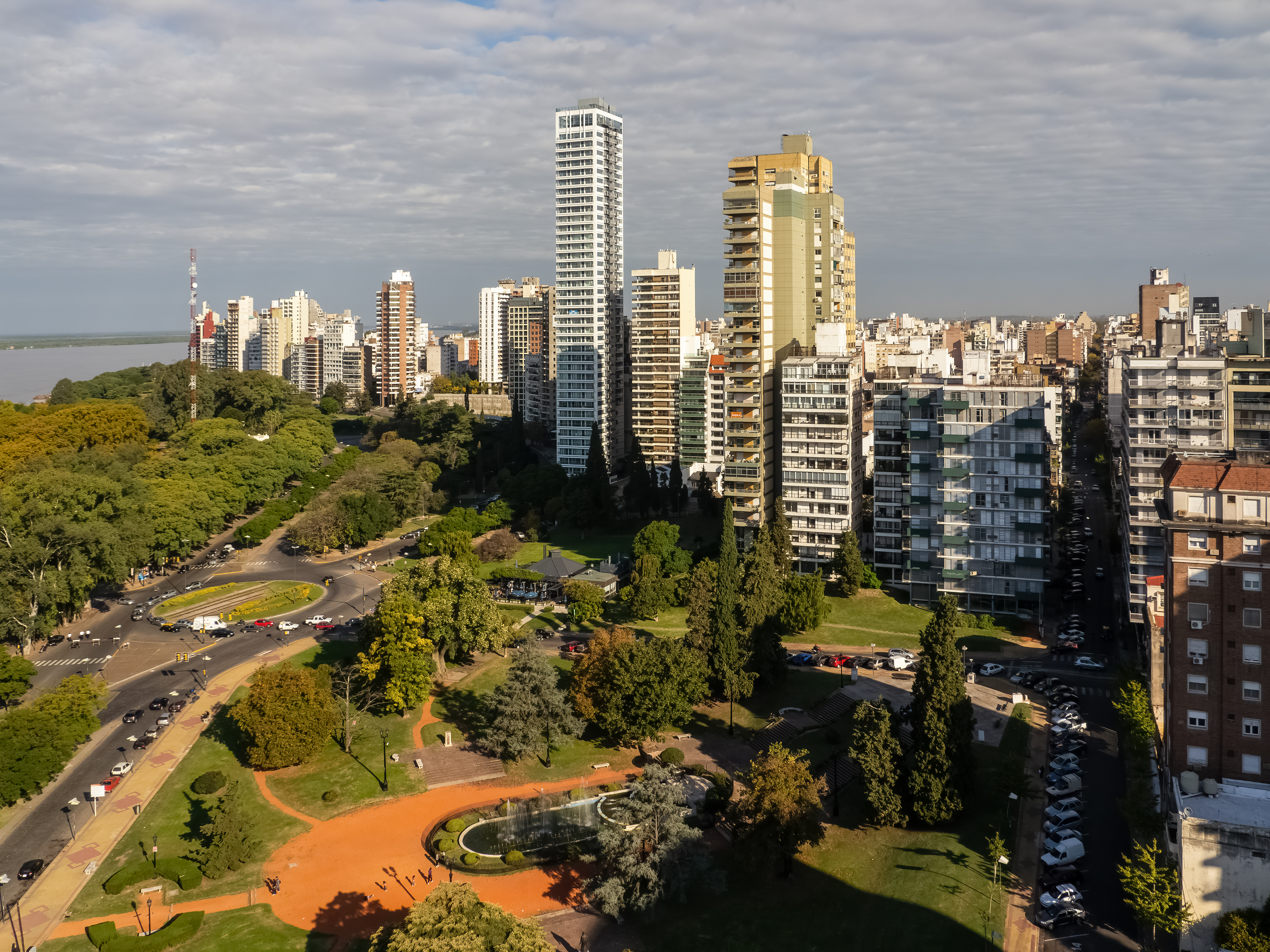
3. Rosario (Greater Rosario)

4. Mendoza (Greater Mendoza)

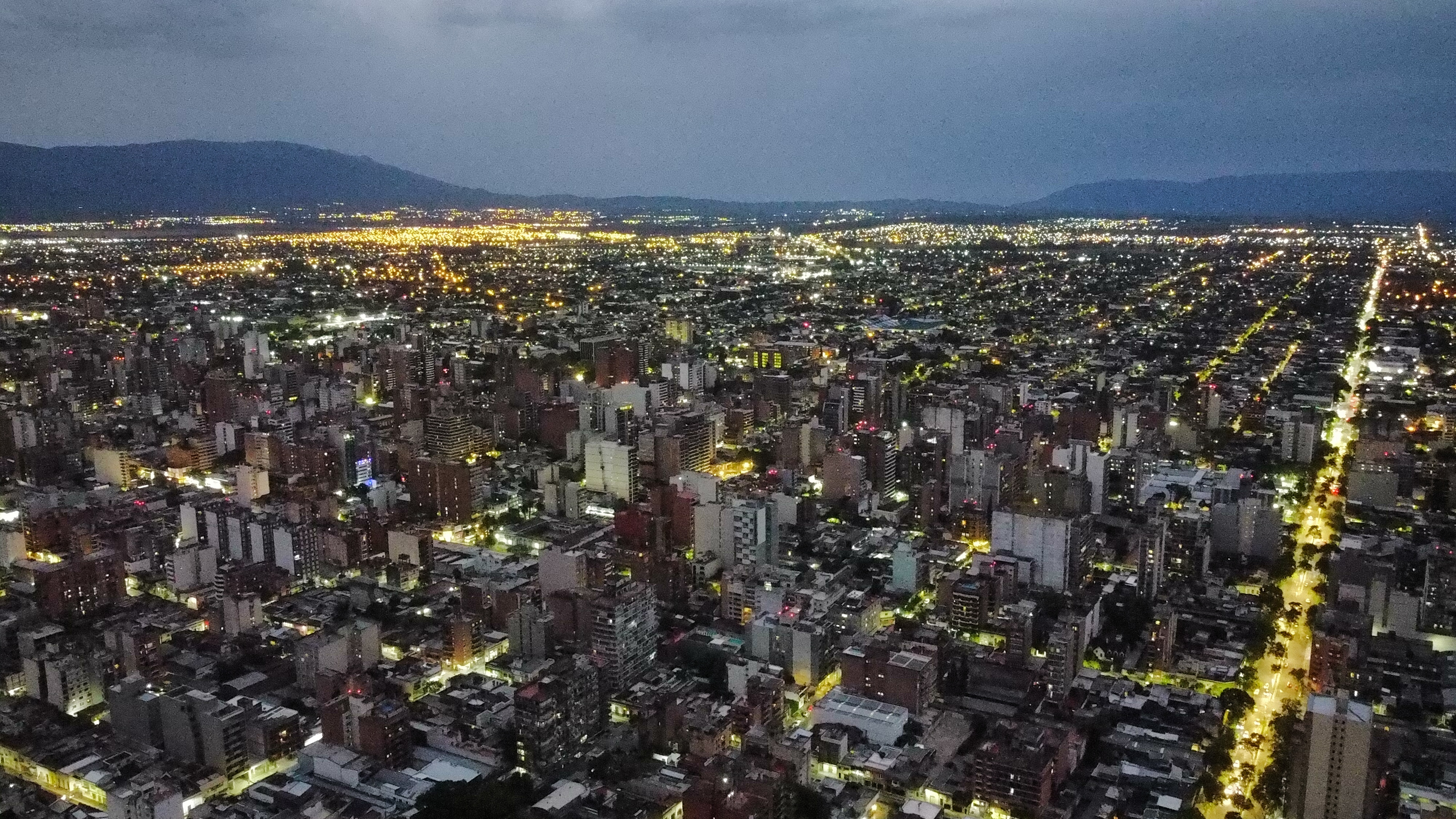
9. San Miguel de Tucumán (Greater San Miguel de Tucumán)

La Plata (Greater La Plata)

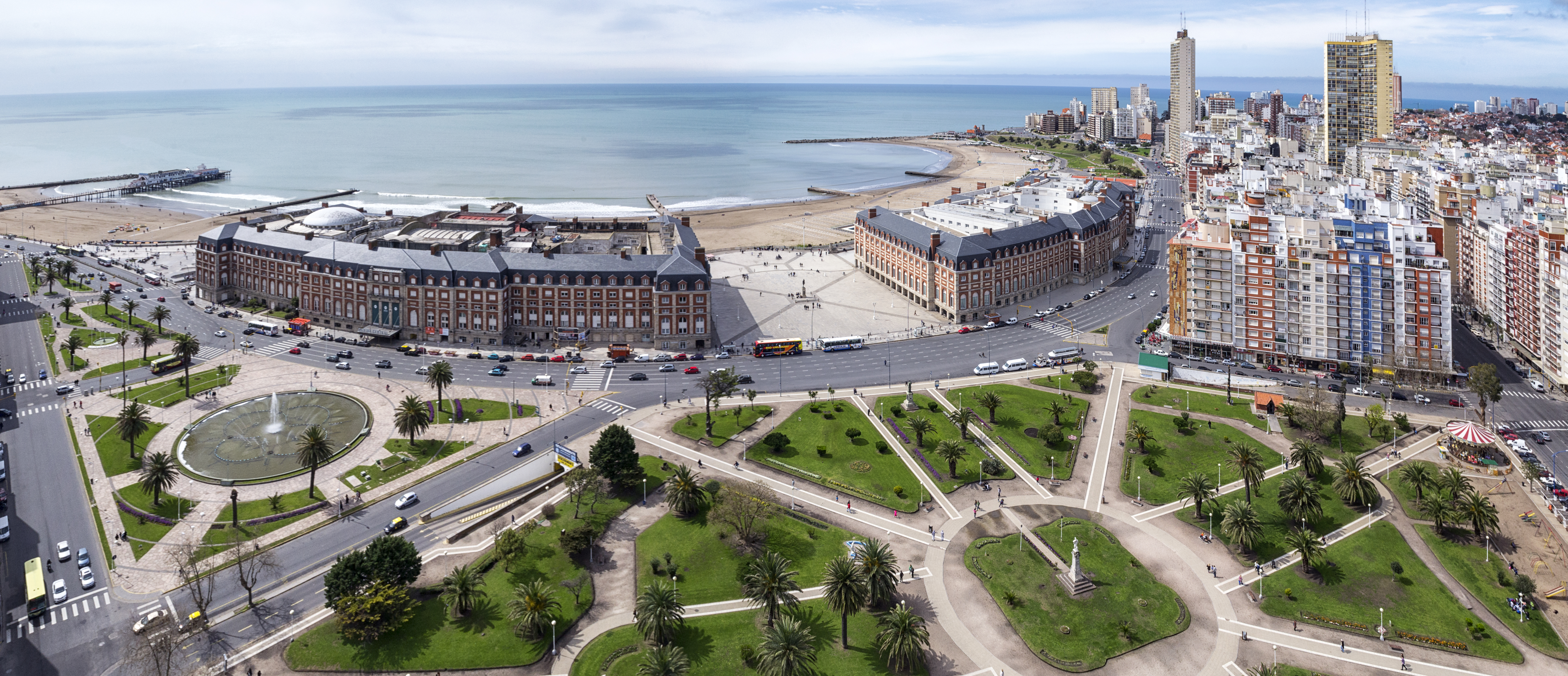
7. Mar del Plata

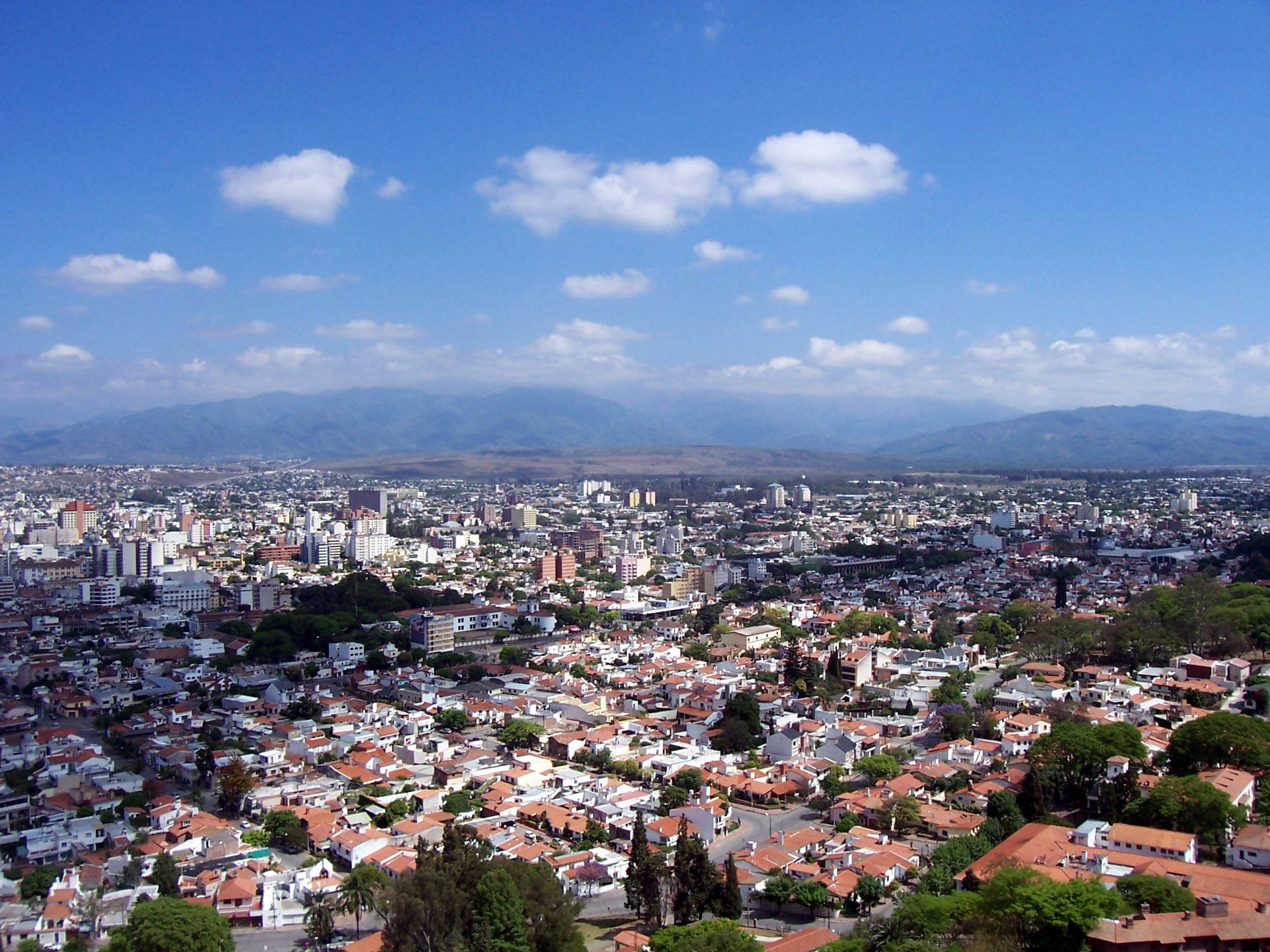
8. Salta (Greater Salta)

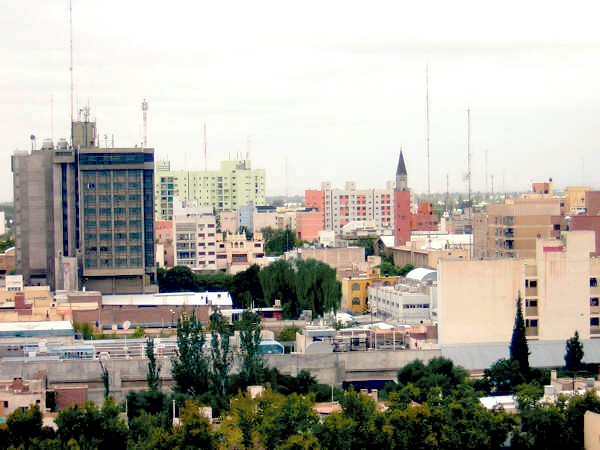
9. San Juan (Greater San Juan)

10. Resistencia (Greater Resistencia)

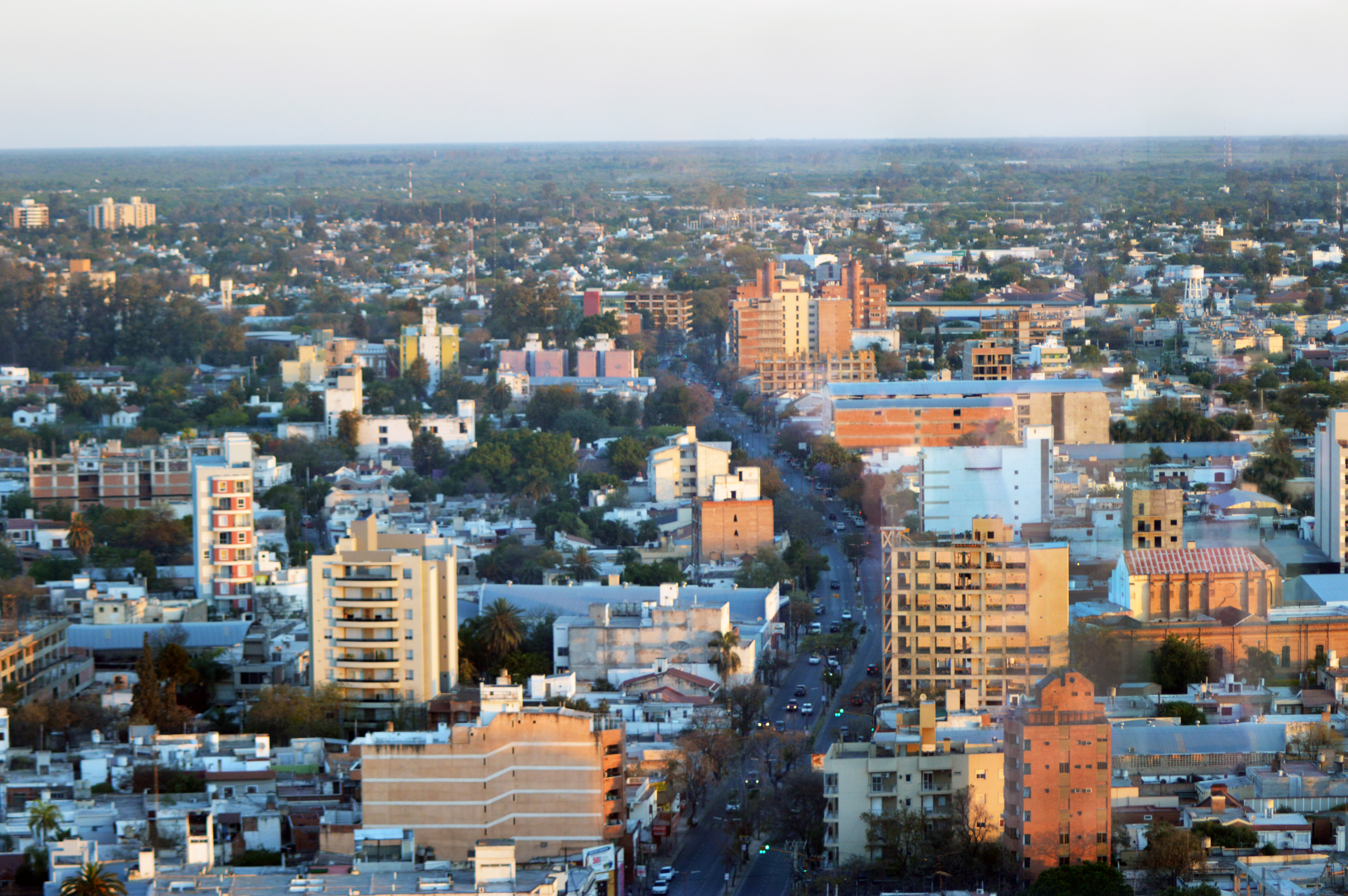
11. Santiago del Estero (Santiago del Estero-La Banda)

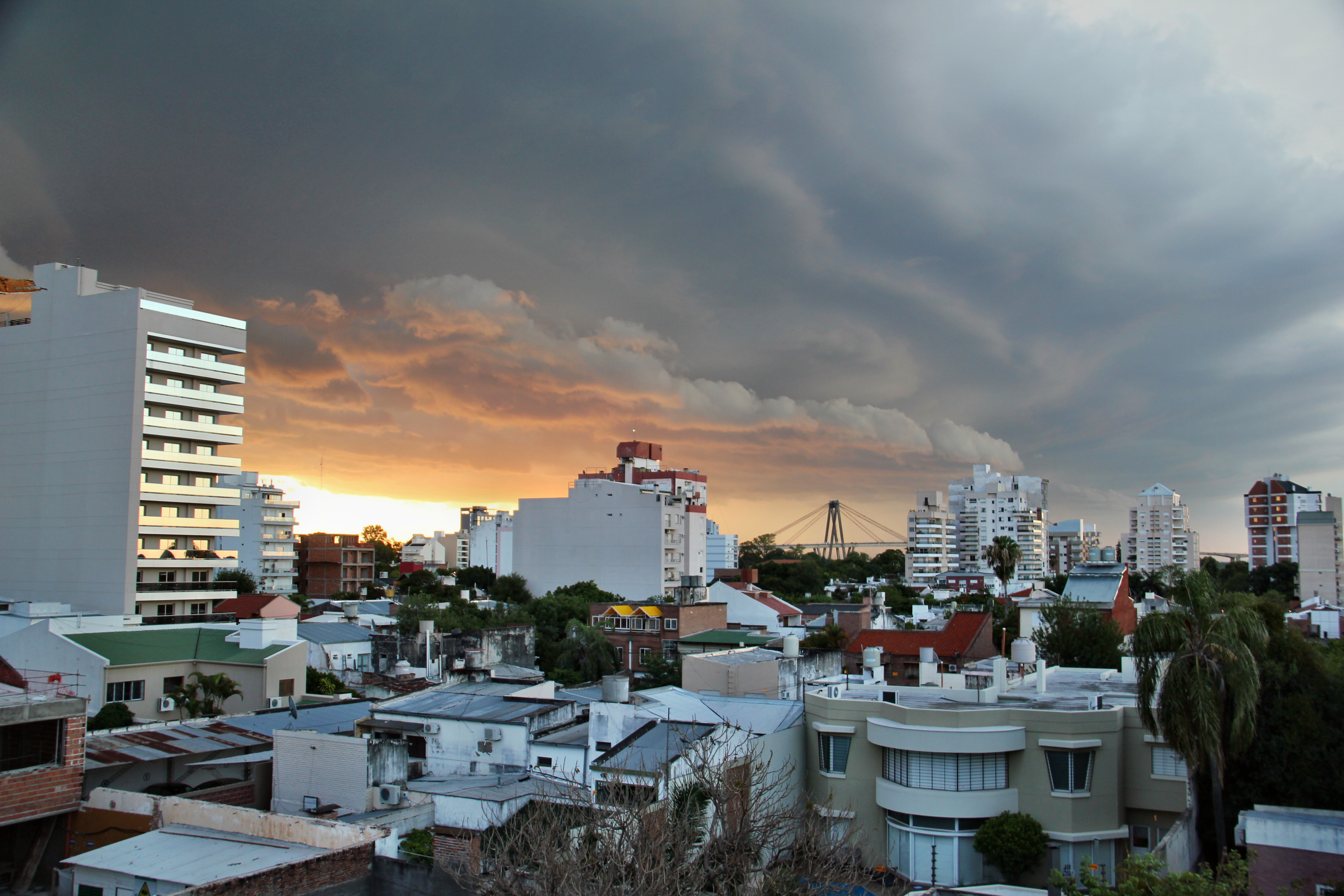
12. Corrientes (Greater Corrientes)

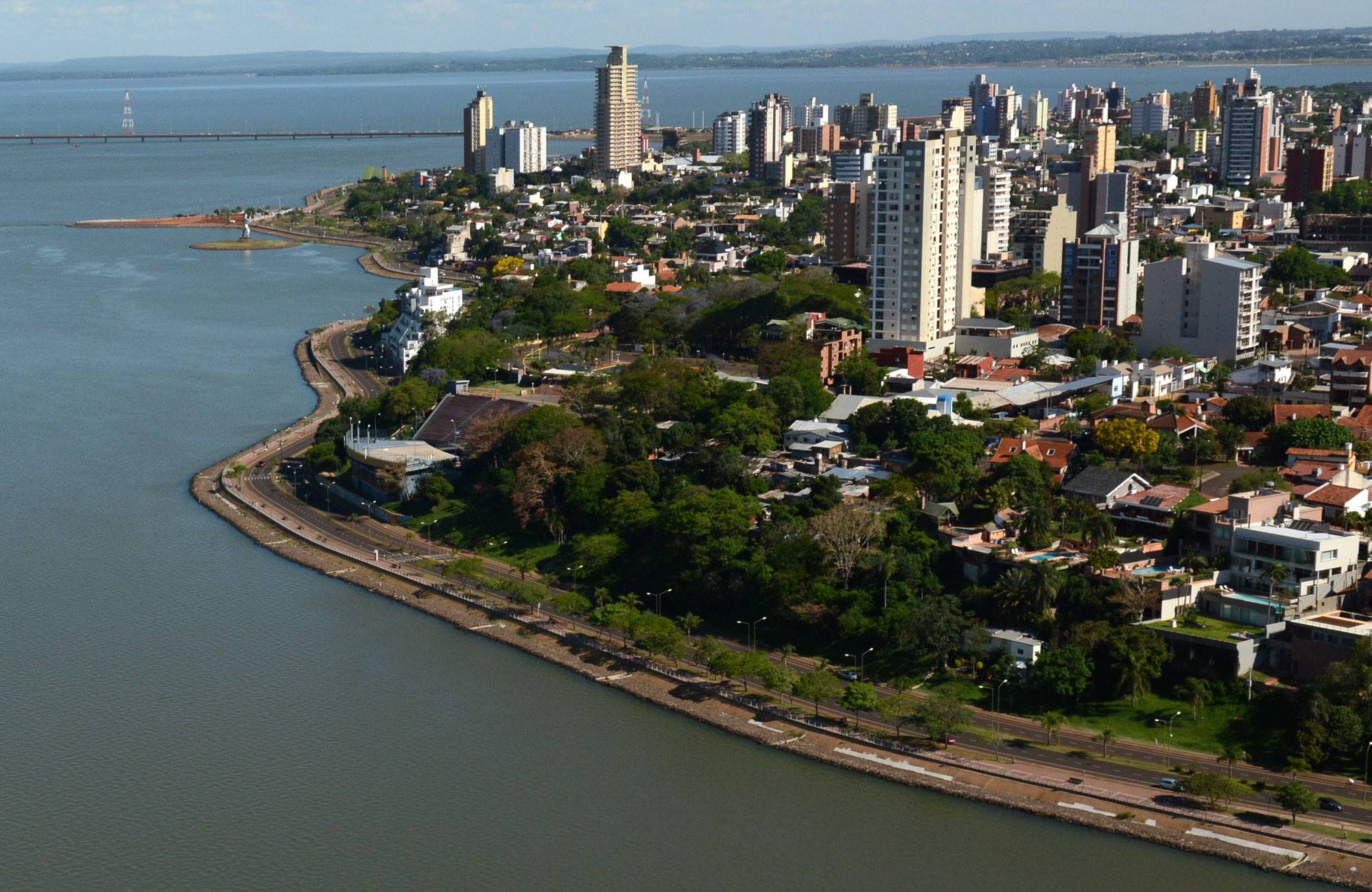
13. Posadas (Greater Posadas)

14. Santa Fe (Greater Santa Fe)

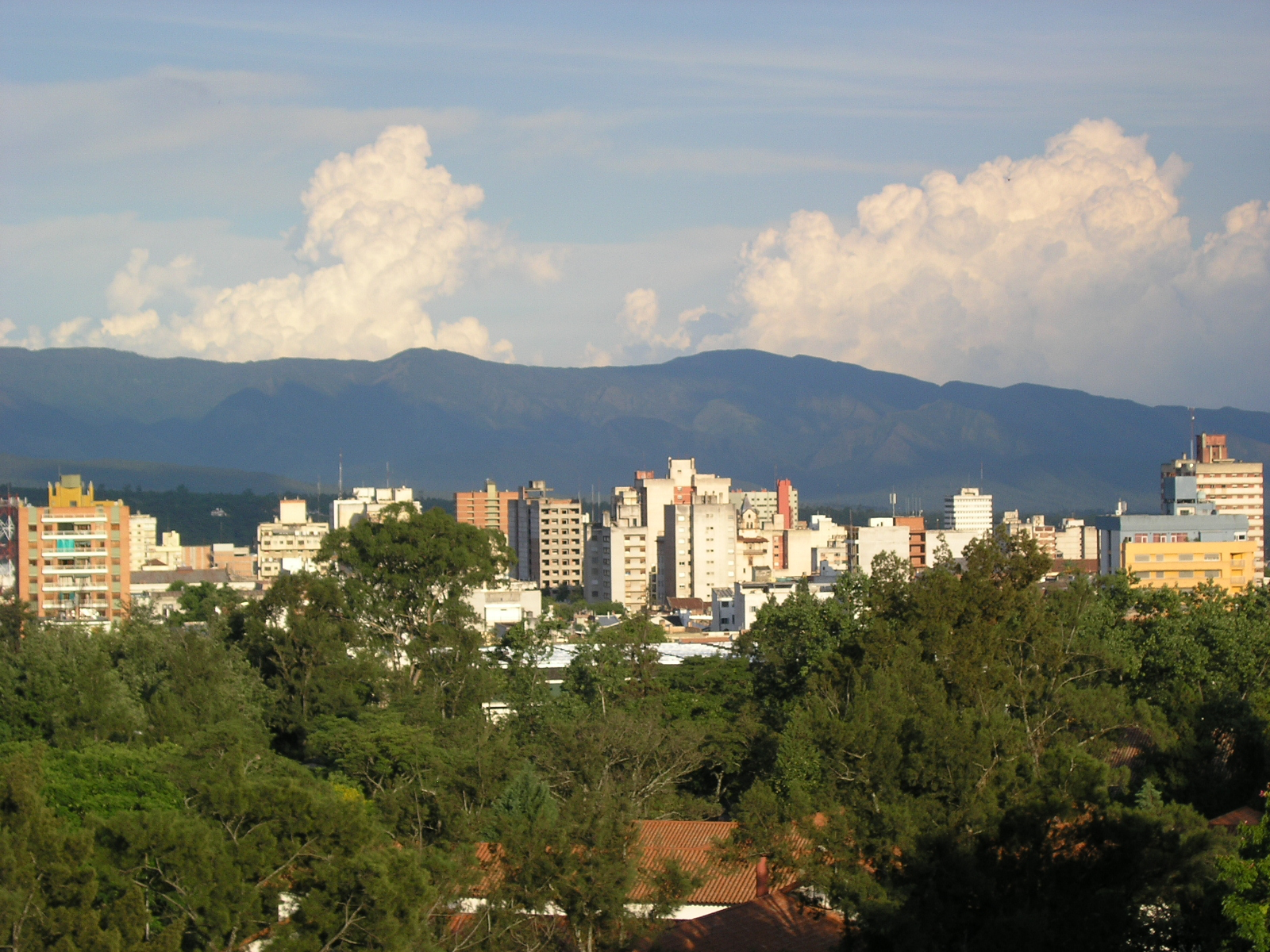
15. San Salvador de Jujuy (Greater San Salvador de Jujuy)

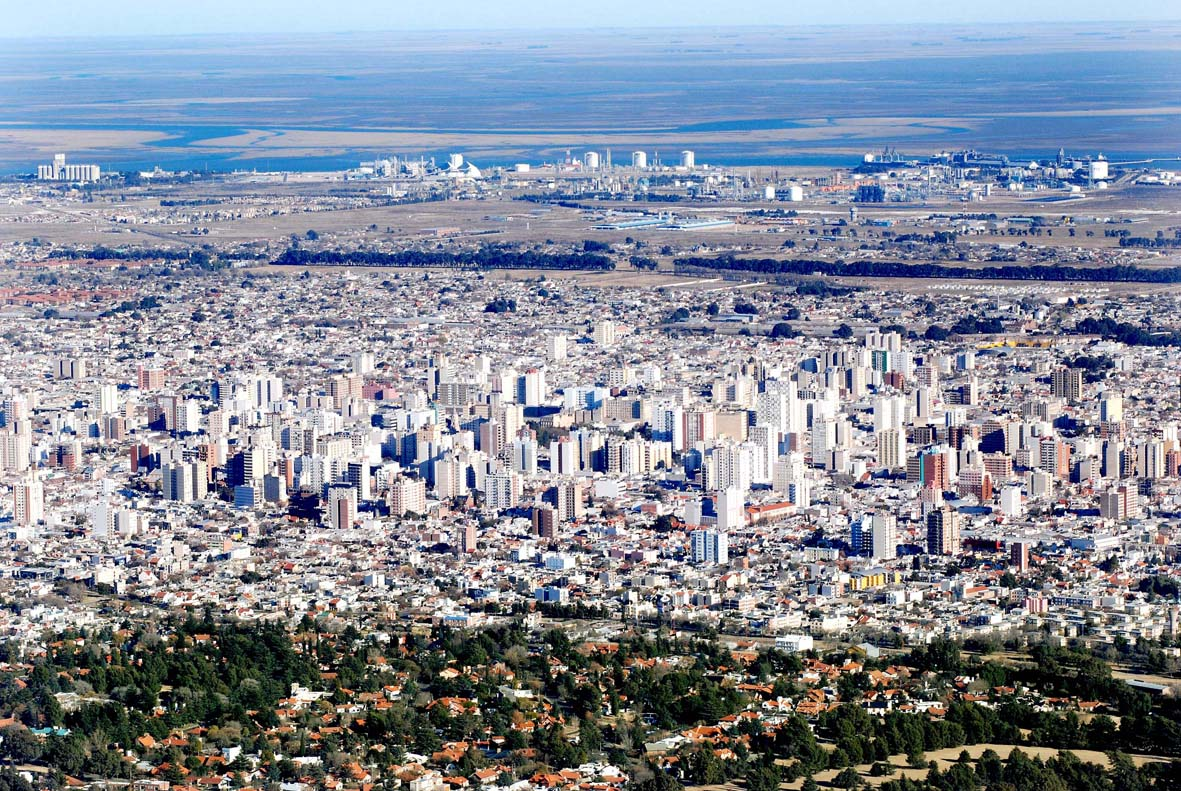
16. Bahía Blanca (Greater Bahía Blanca)

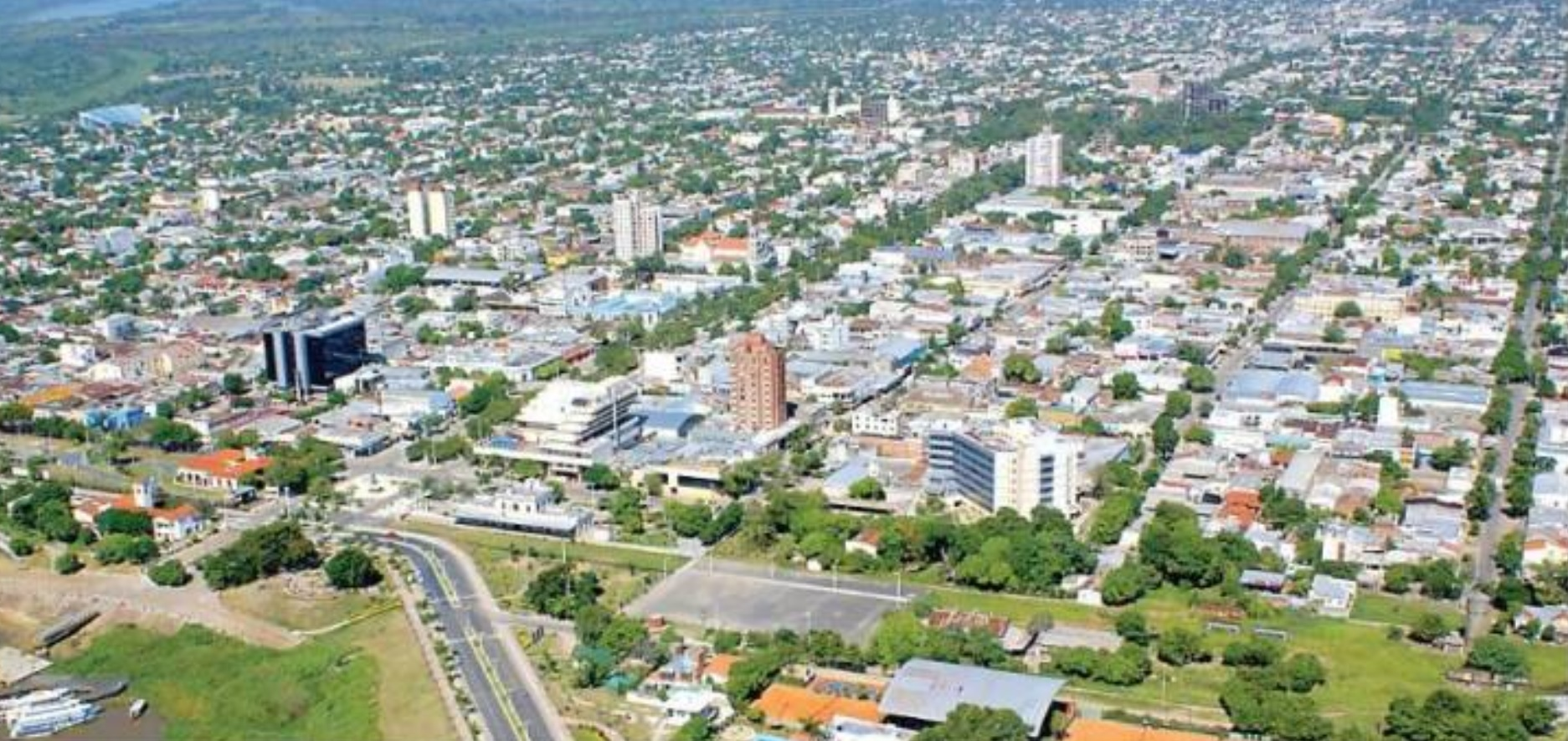
17. Formosa

18. Neuquén

19. La Rioja

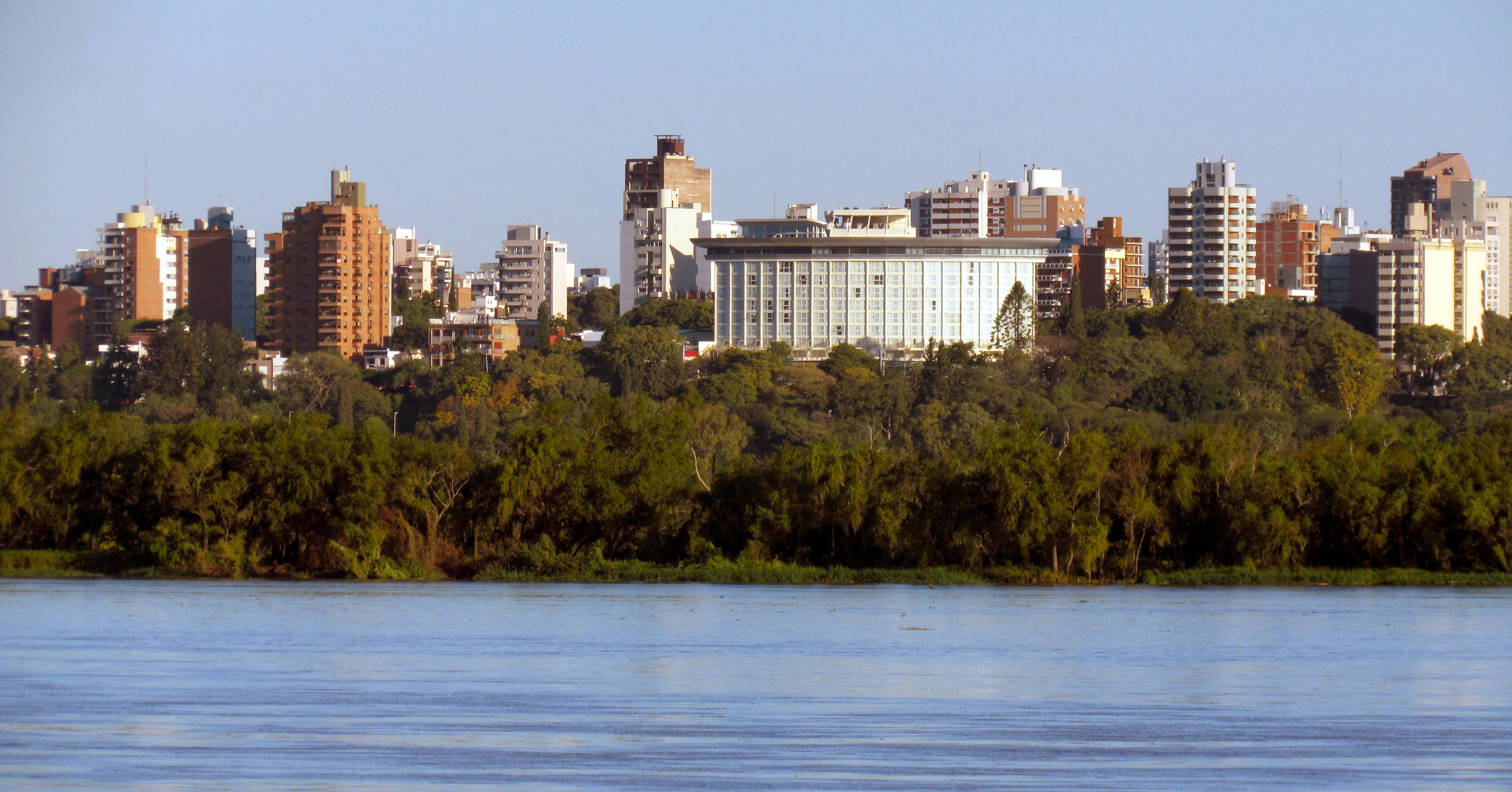
20. Paraná (Greater Paraná)

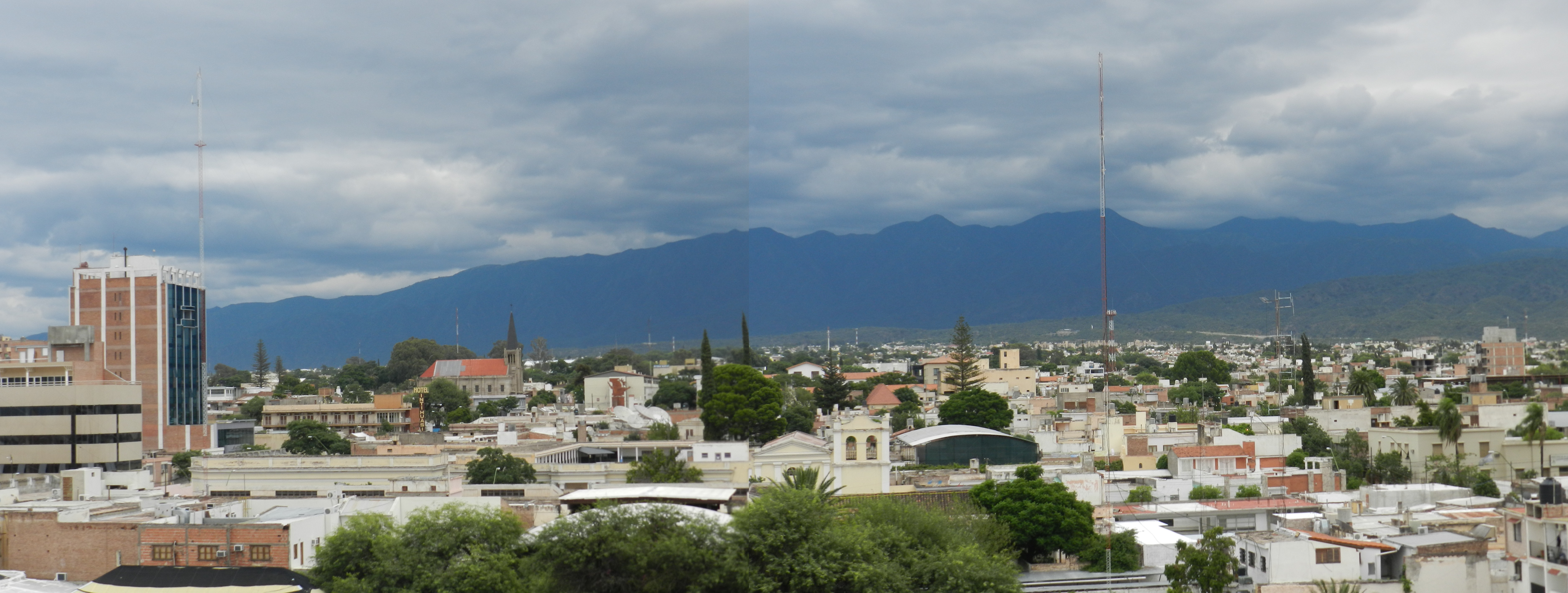
21. San Fernando del Valle de Catamarca (Greater San Fernando del Valle de Catamarca)

22. San Luis (Greater San Luis)

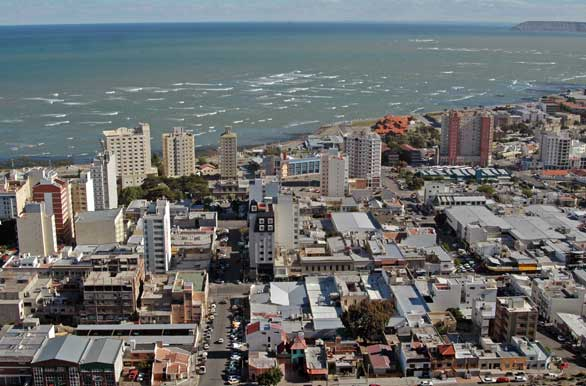
23. Comodoro Rivadavia (Comodoro Rivadavia metropolitan area)

24. Río Cuarto

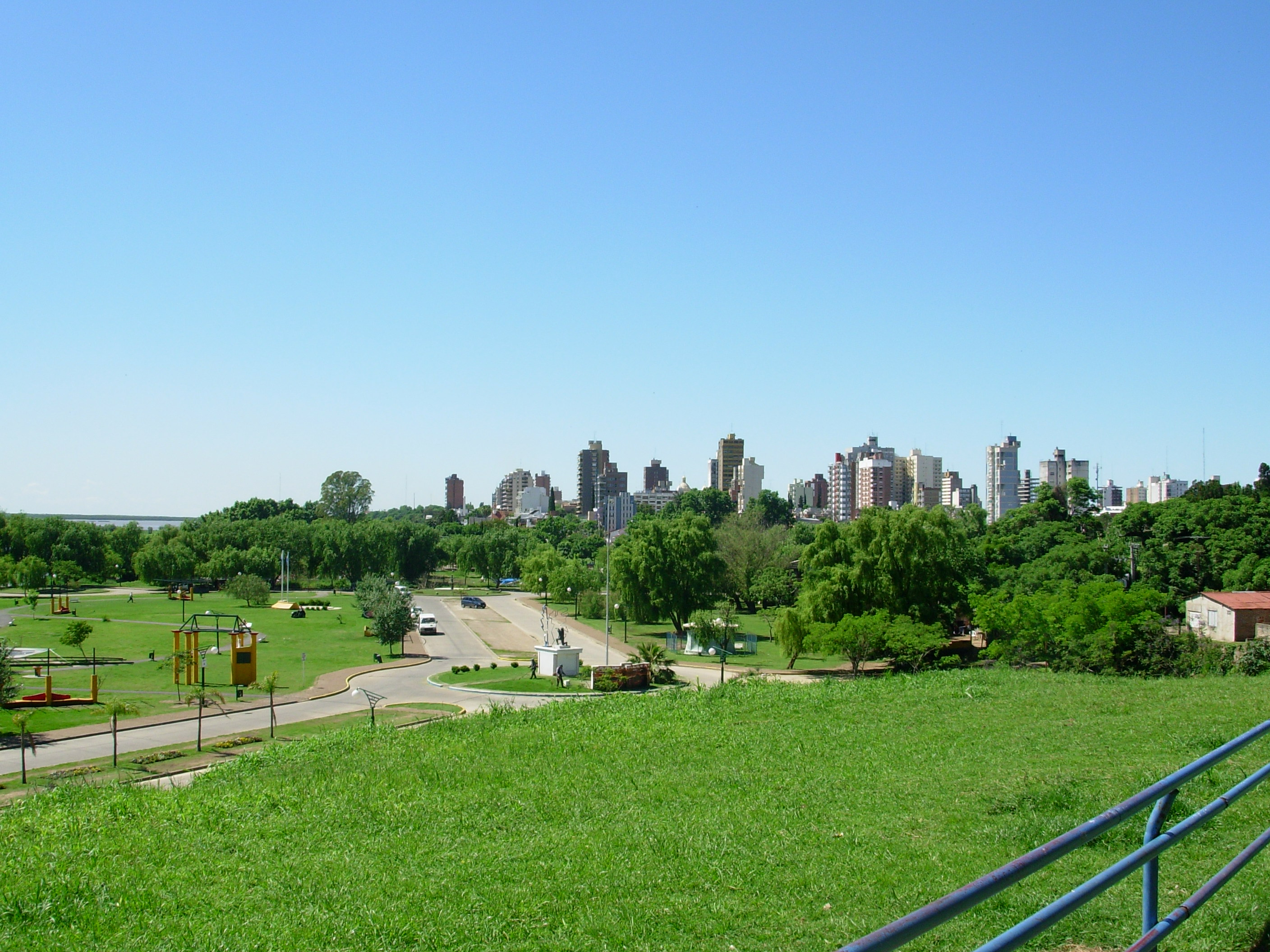
25. San Nicolás de los Arroyos

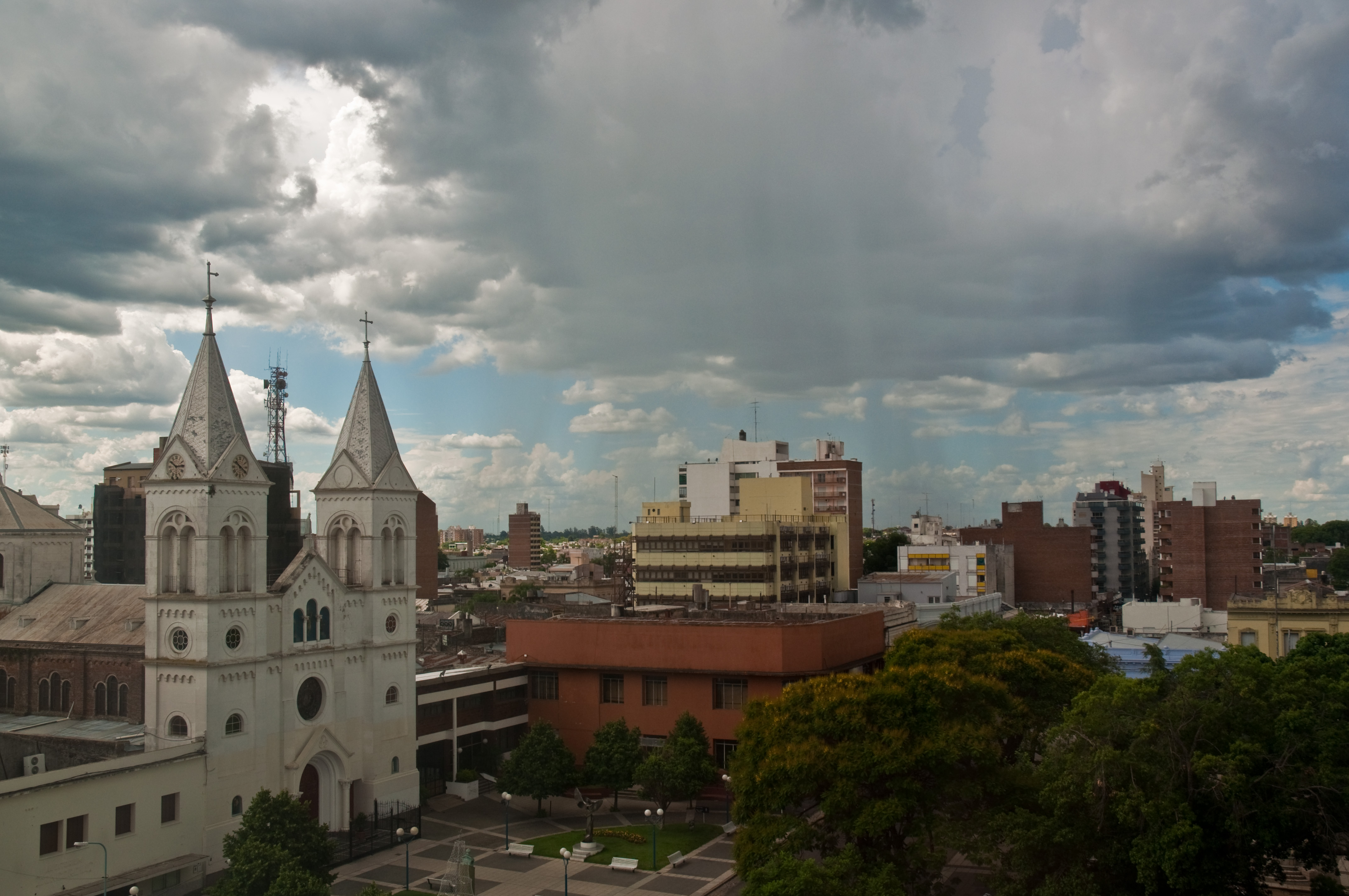
26. Concordia

27. Río Gallegos

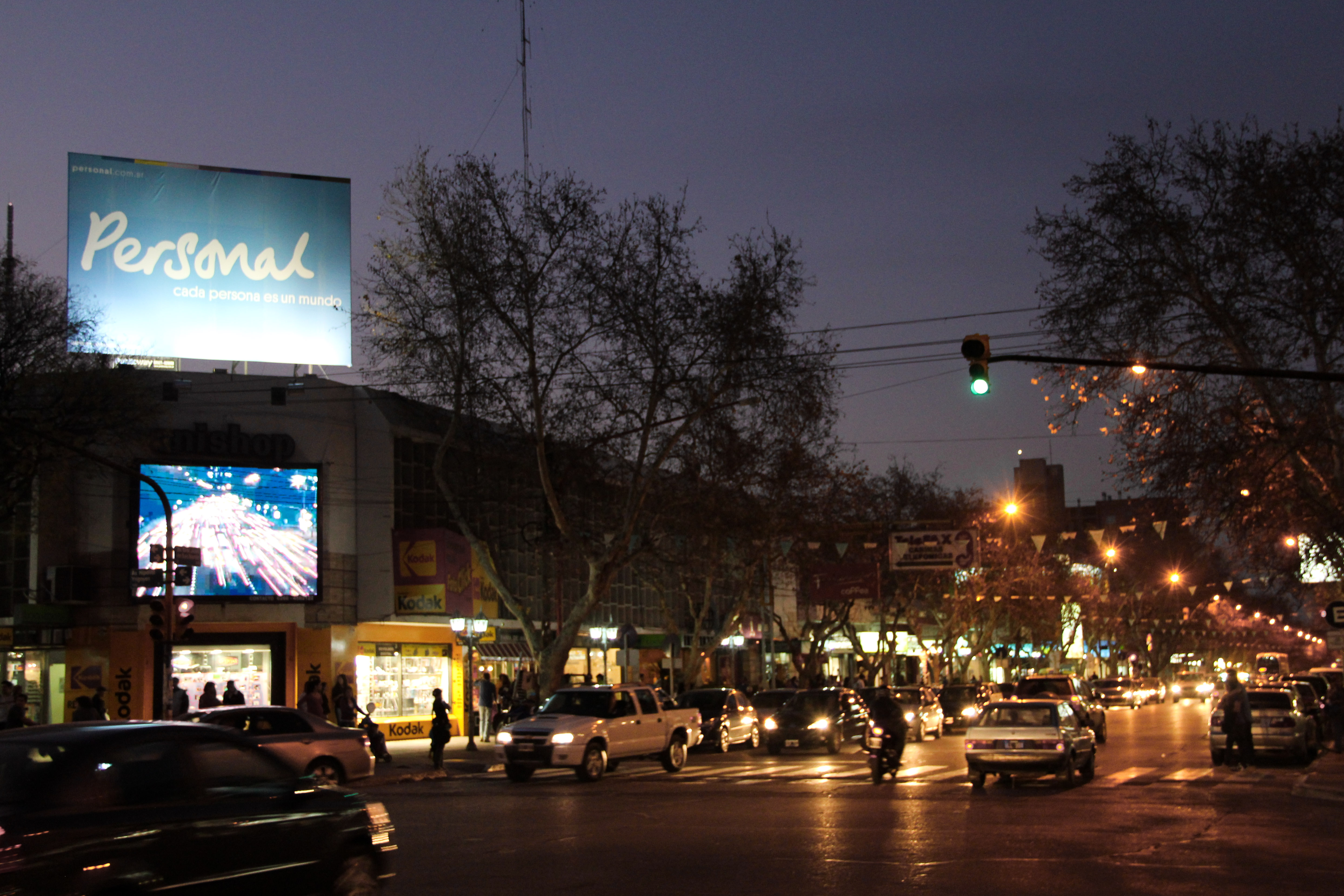
28. San Rafel

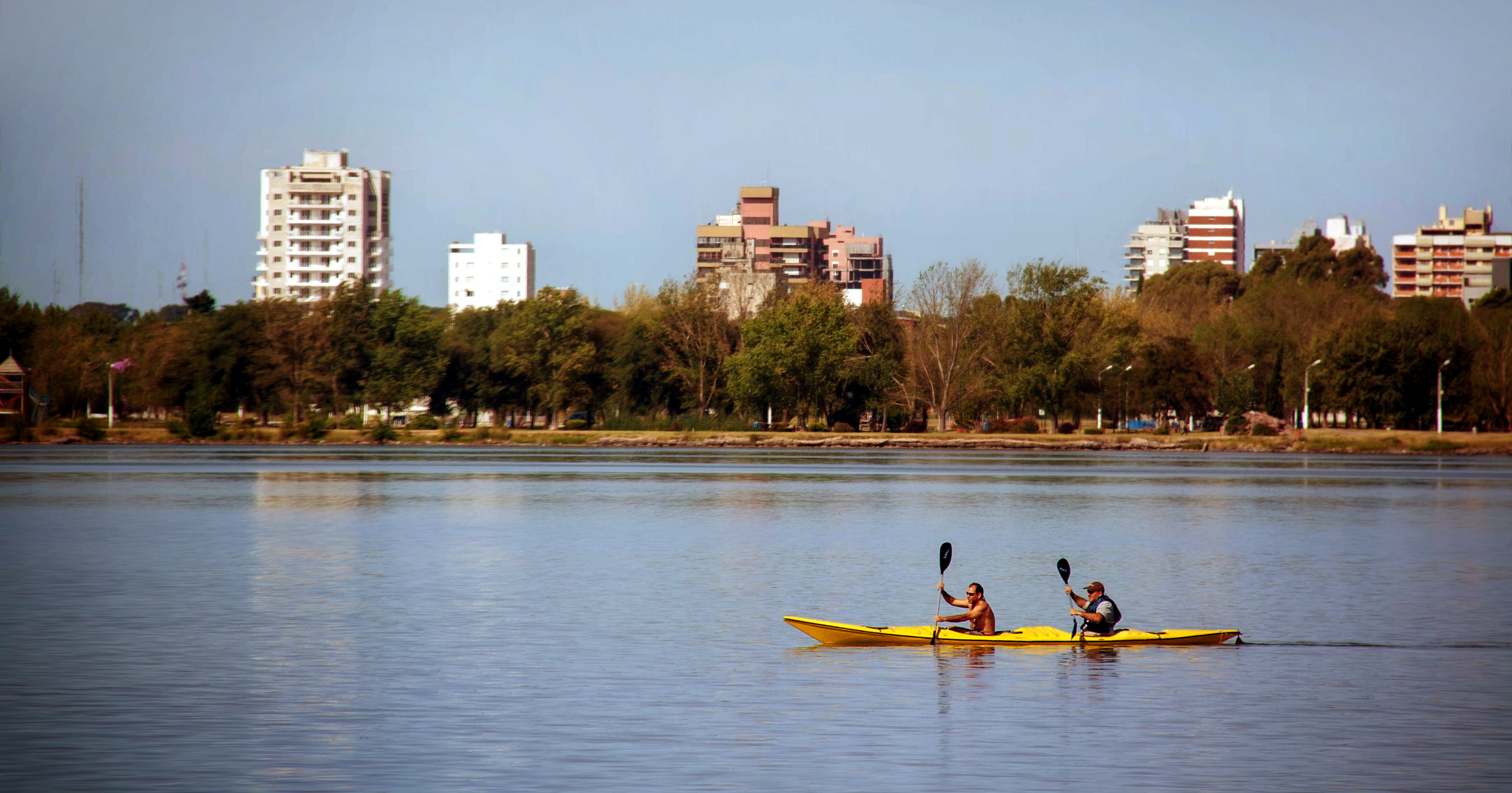
29. Santa Rosa (Greater Santa Rosa)

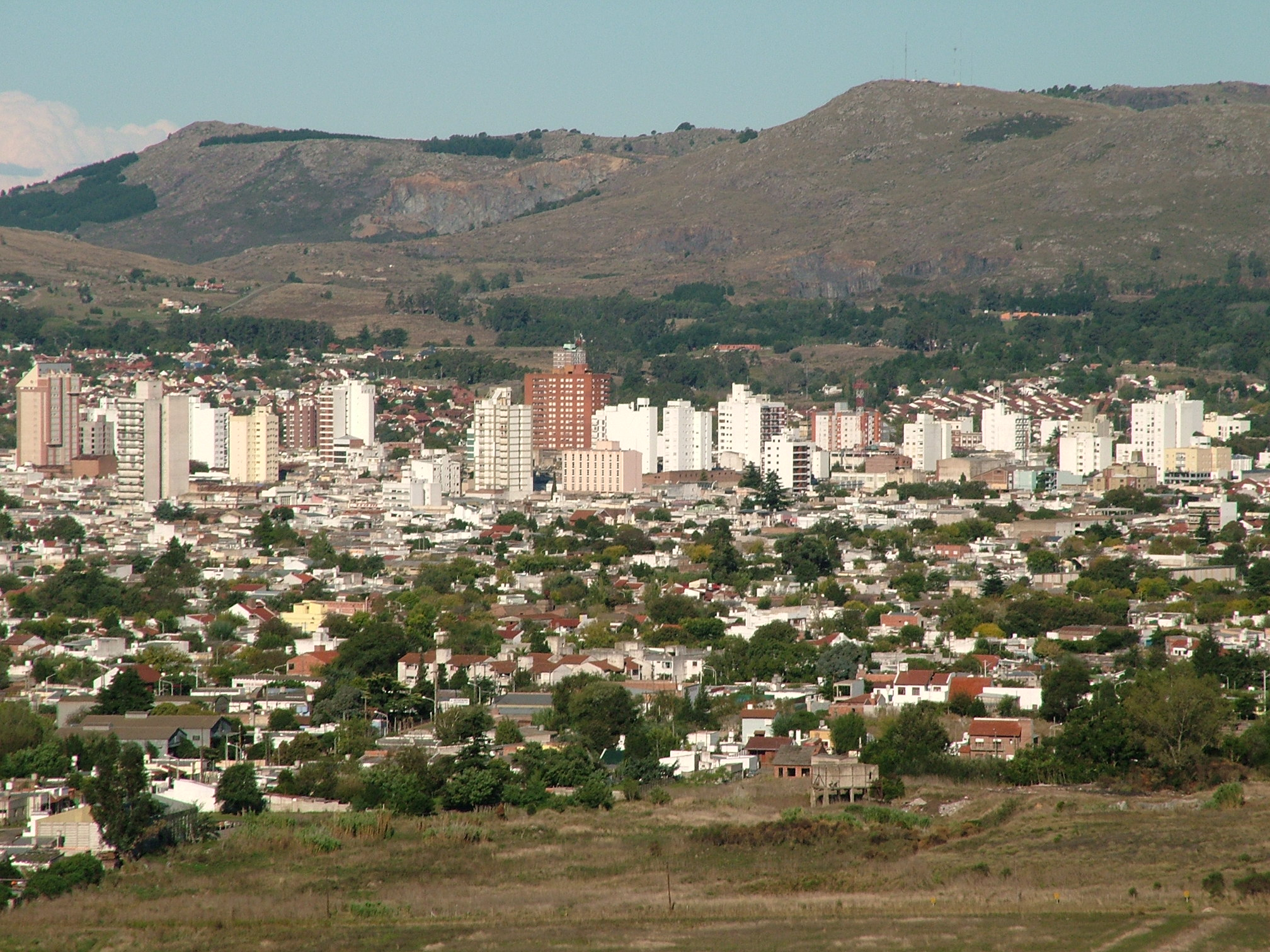
30. Tandil
