= Chilecito Department =

Chilecito Departamento Chilecito
- Department
- Interactive map of Chilecito
- Country: Argentina
- Seat: Chilecito

Area
  - Total: 4,846 km^{2} (1,871 sq mi)

Population (2022)
  - Total: 58,798
  - Density: 12.13/km^{2} (31.43/sq mi)

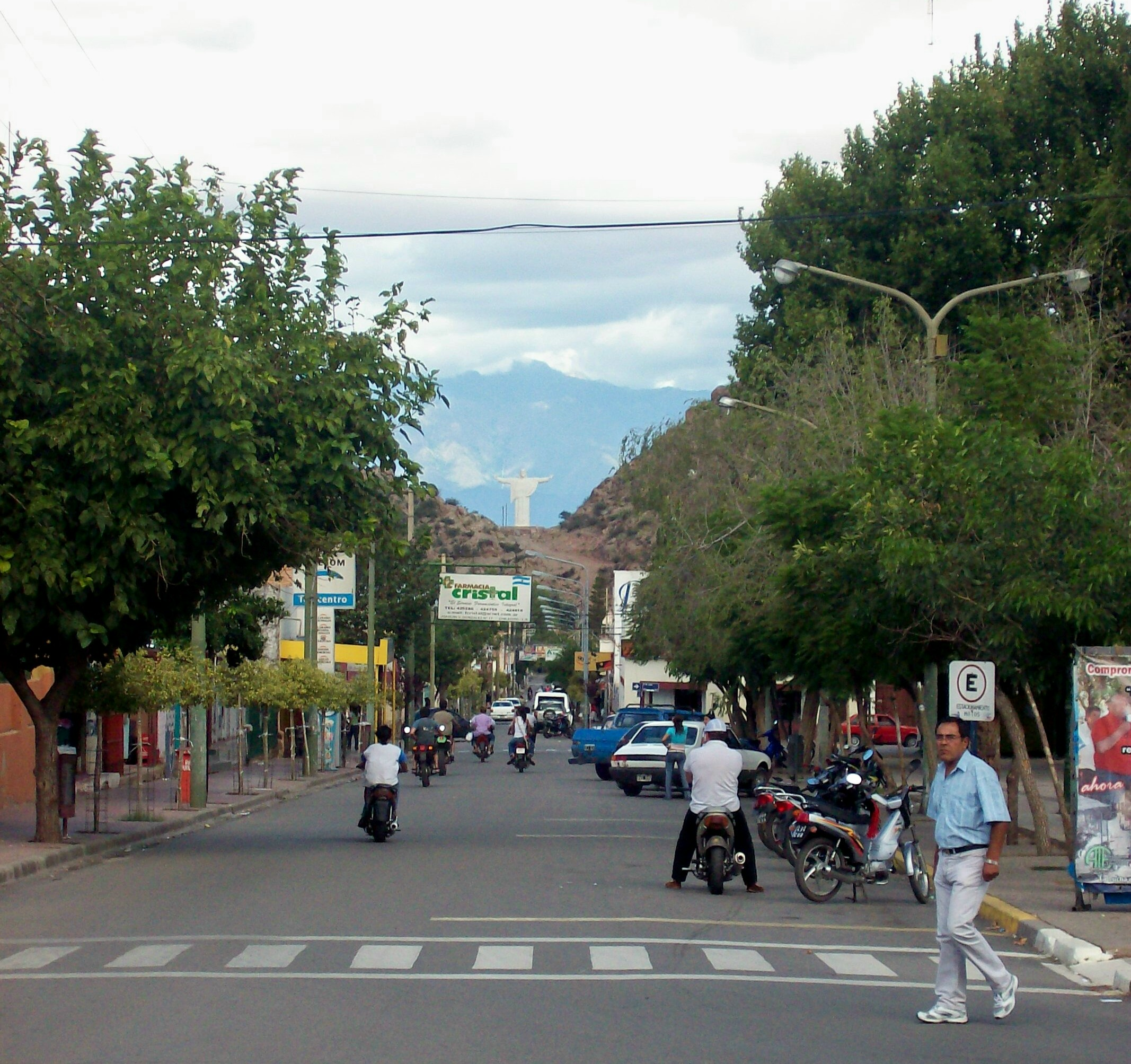
Chilecito Department

Chilecito is a department of the province of La Rioja (Argentina).

== Settlements ==
- Anguinán
- Chilecito
- Colonia Catinzaco
- Guanchín
- Los Sarmientos
- Malligasta
- Nonogasta
- San Miguel
- Sañogasta
- Santa Florentina
- Tilimuqui
- Vichigasta
