= Ricardo Herrera =

Ricardo Herrera may refer to:

- Ricardo Herrera (tennis)
- Ricardo Herrera (politician)
- Ricardo Herrera Lira, Chilean engineer and politician
