= Acevedo =

Acevedo may refer to:

== Places ==
- Acevedo, Huila, Colombia
- Acevedo, Venezuela, a municipality in the state of Miranda
- Acevedo, Buenos Aires, locality in Pergamino Partido
- Acevedo station, a Medellin, Colombia Metro station

== People ==
- Acevedo (surname), a Spanish surname
