= Aníbal Acevedo =

Aníbal Acevedo may refer to:

- Aníbal Acevedo Vilá (born 1962), eighth governor of the Commonwealth of Puerto Rico
- Aníbal Santiago Acevedo (born 1971), Puerto Rican boxer

== See also ==
- Acevedo (disambiguation)
