= Faith Party =

Argentine political party

Faith Party Partido Fe
- President: Cecilio Salazar
- Founded: 25 April 2013; 12 years ago
- Ideology: Federal Peronism; Orthodox Peronism
- Political position: Right-wing
- National affiliation: La Libertad Avanza
- Colours: Olive green, blue
- Seats in the Chamber of Deputies: 0 / 257
- Seats in the Senate: 0 / 72
- Province Governors: 0 / 24
- Seats in the provincial legislatures: 3 / 1,199
- Seats in municipalities: 4 / 2,112

The Faith Party (Spanish: Partido Fe) is a political party in Argentina, officially founded on 25 April 2013 by union leader Gerónimo Venegas (1941-2017). After the death of Venegas, on 26 June 2017, the presidency of the party was temporally held by Juan Carlos Castro. In 2019, Cecilio Salazar was elected president of the Faith Party at the national level.

== Districts ==
District	Alliance	Ref.
Buenos Aires	La Libertad Avanza	
Buenos Aires	None	
Catamarca	Unión por la Patria	
Chaco	La Libertad Avanza	
Córdoba	Hacemos por Nuestro Pais	
Corrientes	La Libertad Avanza	
Chaco	Unión por la Patria	
Entre Ríos	La Libertad Avanza	
Formosa	Unión por la Patria	
Mendoza	None	
Misiones	None	
Río Negro	La Libertad Avanza	
Salta	None	
Santa Fe	None	
Santiago del Estero	Frente Cívico por Santiago	
