= Colonia Vichigasta =

Coordinates: 29°29′S 67°31′W

- Municipality and village
- Interactive map of Colonia Vichigasta
- Country: Argentina
- Province: La Rioja Province
- Department: Chilecito

Population (2010)
  - Total: 272
- Time zone: UTC−3 (ART)

Colonia Vichigasta is a municipality and village within the Chilecito Department of La Rioja Province in northwestern Argentina. It is situated immediately west of the larger village and municipality of Vichigasta.
