= Cecilio Salazar =

Argentine trade unionist and politician (born 1954)

Mayor of San Pedro
- Incumbent
- Assumed office December 10, 2015
- Preceded by: Fabio Giovanettoni (2014–2015) (interim); Pablo Guacone (2009–2014) (resigned)

Leader of the San Pedro Faith Party
- Incumbent
- Assumed office 2013

President of the San Pedro Justicialist Party
- In office 1999 – 2003 (resigned)

Vice president of OSPRERA
- Incumbent
- Assumed office 1995
- President: Gerónimo Venegas

Secretary General of UATRE San Pedro
- Incumbent
- Assumed office 1974

Personal details
- Born: December 9, 1954 (age 71) San Pedro, Buenos Aires Province, Argentina
- Party: Faith Party
- Other political affiliations: Cambiemos
- Children: Ramón Salazar; Lorena Salazar
- Occupation: trade unionist and politician

Cecilio Salazar maternal surname Caceres (born December 9, 1954) is an Argentine trade unionist and politician.

He has been the mayor of San Pedro, Buenos Aires since December 10, 2015.
