= Ricardo Herrera (politician) =

Argentine politician

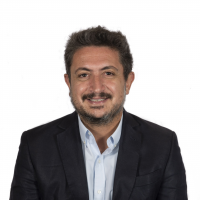

National Deputy
- Incumbent
- Assumed office 10 December 2021
- Constituency: La Rioja

Provincial Legislator of La Rioja
- In office 10 December 2015 – 10 December 2019
- Constituency: Chilecito Department

Personal details
- Born: 5 December 1974 (age 51)
- Party: Justicialist Party
- Other political affiliations: Frente de Todos (2019–2023); Union for the Homeland (since 2023)
- Occupation: Lawyer

Jorge Ricardo Herrera (born 5 December 1974) is an Argentine politician. A member of the Justicialist Party, he was elected to the National Chamber of Deputies in 2021 in La Rioja Province. From 2015 to 2019, he was a member of the Legislature of La Rioja representing Chilecito Department.

== Biography ==
Herrera worked as a lawyer.

== Electoral history ==
Electoral history of Ricardo Herrera
Election	Office	List	#	District	Votes			Result	Ref.
Election	Office	List	#	District	Total	%	P.	Result	Ref.
2015	Provincial Legislator	Frente de Todos	2	Chilecito Department	8.962	36,20%	1st (Note: Presented on an electoral list. The data shown represents the share of the vote the entire party/alliance received in that constituency.)	Elected	
2021	National Deputy	Frente de Todos	2	La Rioja	100,055	56.16%	1st	Elected	
