= Colonia Catinzaco =

Coordinates: 29°40′S 67°23′W

- Municipality and village
- Interactive map of Colonia Catinzaco
- Country: Argentina
- Province: La Rioja Province
- Time zone: UTC−3 (ART)

Colonia Catinzaco is a municipality and village in La Rioja Province in northwestern Argentina.
