= Manuel Ocampo, Buenos Aires =

Manuel Ocampo
- Town
- Location within Buenos Aires Province
- Coordinates: 33°45′52″S 60°39′07″W
- Country: Argentina
- Province: Buenos Aires
- Partidos: Pergamino
- Established: 1911
- Elevation: 72 m (236 ft)

Population (2001 Census)
  - Total: 1,210
- Time zone: UTC−3 (ART)
- CPA Base: B 2713
- Climate: Dfc

Manuel Ocampo is a town located in the Pergamino Partido in the province of Buenos Aires, Argentina. The town is located near the border with the province of Santa Fe.

== Geography ==
Manuel Ocampo is located 16 km (9.9 mi) from the regional capital of Pergamino and 96 km (60 mi) from Rosario.

== History ==
A railway station was built in what would become Manuel Ocampo in 1894 by the Central Argentine Railway on railway tracks which were constructed in 1890. The town was established in 1911 after the owners of the land where the town was to be built decided to divide their land, with a grid of 96 blocks established. The town was named after a relative of the family who founded Manuel Ocampo.

== Population ==
According to INDEC, which collects population data for the country, the town had a population of 1,210 people as of the 2001 census.
