= Greater Bahía Blanca =

Urban agglomeration in Argentina

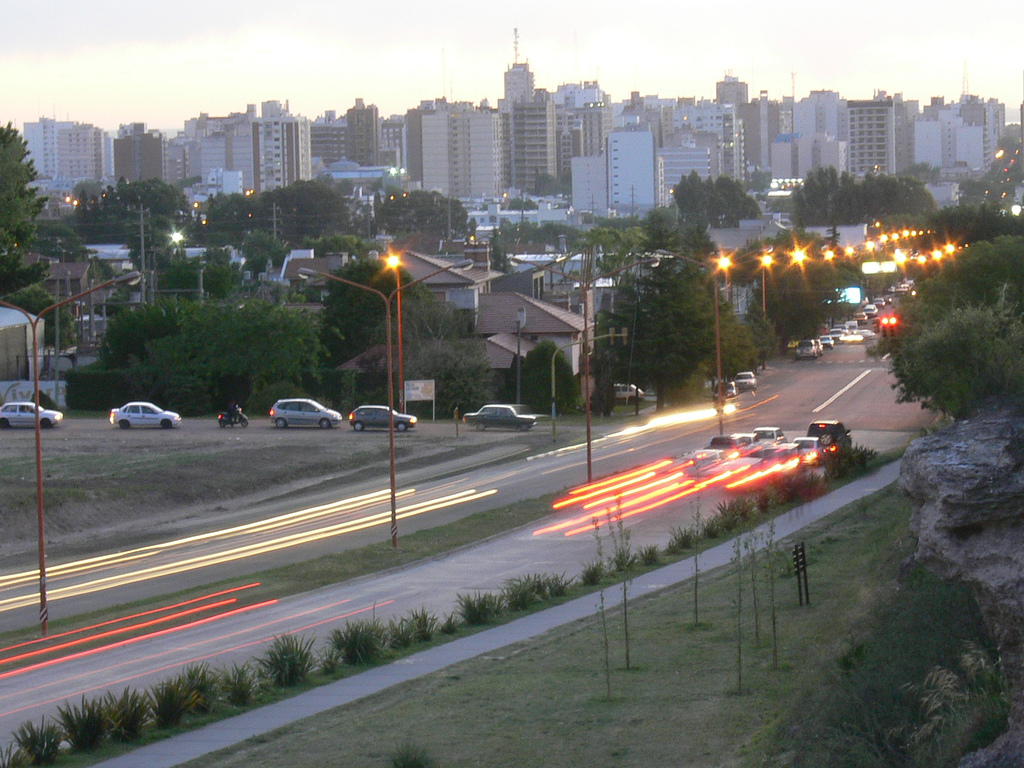
View of Bahía Blanca, Buenos Aires Province, Argentina.

Gran Bahía Blanca (Greater Bahía Blanca) is the name given to the large urban conurbation around the city of Bahía Blanca in Buenos Aires Province, Argentina. The 2001 Census estimated the population of Gran Bahía Blanca as 274,509 making it the 17th largest urban conurbation in Argentina.

| Settlement | Population (1970) | Population (1980) | Population (1991) | Population (2001) | Population (2010) | Population (2022) |
|---|---|---|---|---|---|---|
| Bahía Blanca (Note: Including Villa Harding Green y Villa Stella Maris) | | | 244,767 | 258,243 | 291 327 | |
| Ingeniero White | | | 11,065 | 10,486 | | |
| Grünbein | | | 2,440 | 3,194 | | |
| Villa Espora (Note: Including Base Aeronaval Comandante Espora) | | | 1,242 | 1,604 | | |
| Villa Bordeau | | | 582 | 982 | | |
| Total | 182,158 | 223,818 | 272,191 | 284,776 | 301 572 | 336 574 |
