= San Carlos, La Plata =

San Carlos
- Town
- Location within Argentina
- Coordinates: 34°55′44″S 58°0′0″W
- Country: Argentina
- Province: Buenos Aires
- Partido: La Plata
- Elevation: 16 m (52 ft)

Population (2001 Census)
  - Total: 43,266
- Time zone: UTC−3 (ART)
- CPA Base: B 1901
- Climate: Dfc

San Carlos is a town in Argentina, located in the La Plata Partido of Buenos Aires Province.
