= Gobernador Castro =

- Town
- Location within Buenos Aires Province
- Coordinates: 33°39′31″S 59°52′06″W
- Country: Argentina
- Province: Buenos Aires
- Partidos: Bahía Blanca
- Established: 1903
- Elevation: 32 m (105 ft)

Population (2001 Census)
  - Total: 2,604
- Time zone: UTC−3 (ART)
- CPA Base: B 2946
- Climate: Dfc

Gobernador Castro is a town located in the northeastern edge of the San Pedro Partido in the province of Buenos Aires, Argentina.

== History ==
The land that would become the town was owned by Emilio Castro, who donated the land in order to allow the construction of a rail station in 1878. Rail service to the town ended in 1993, before resuming again in 2023, 30 years later.

== Population ==
According to INDEC, which collects population data for the country, the town had a population of 2,604 people as of the 2001 census.
