= Santa Lucía, Buenos Aires =

Santa Lucía
- Town
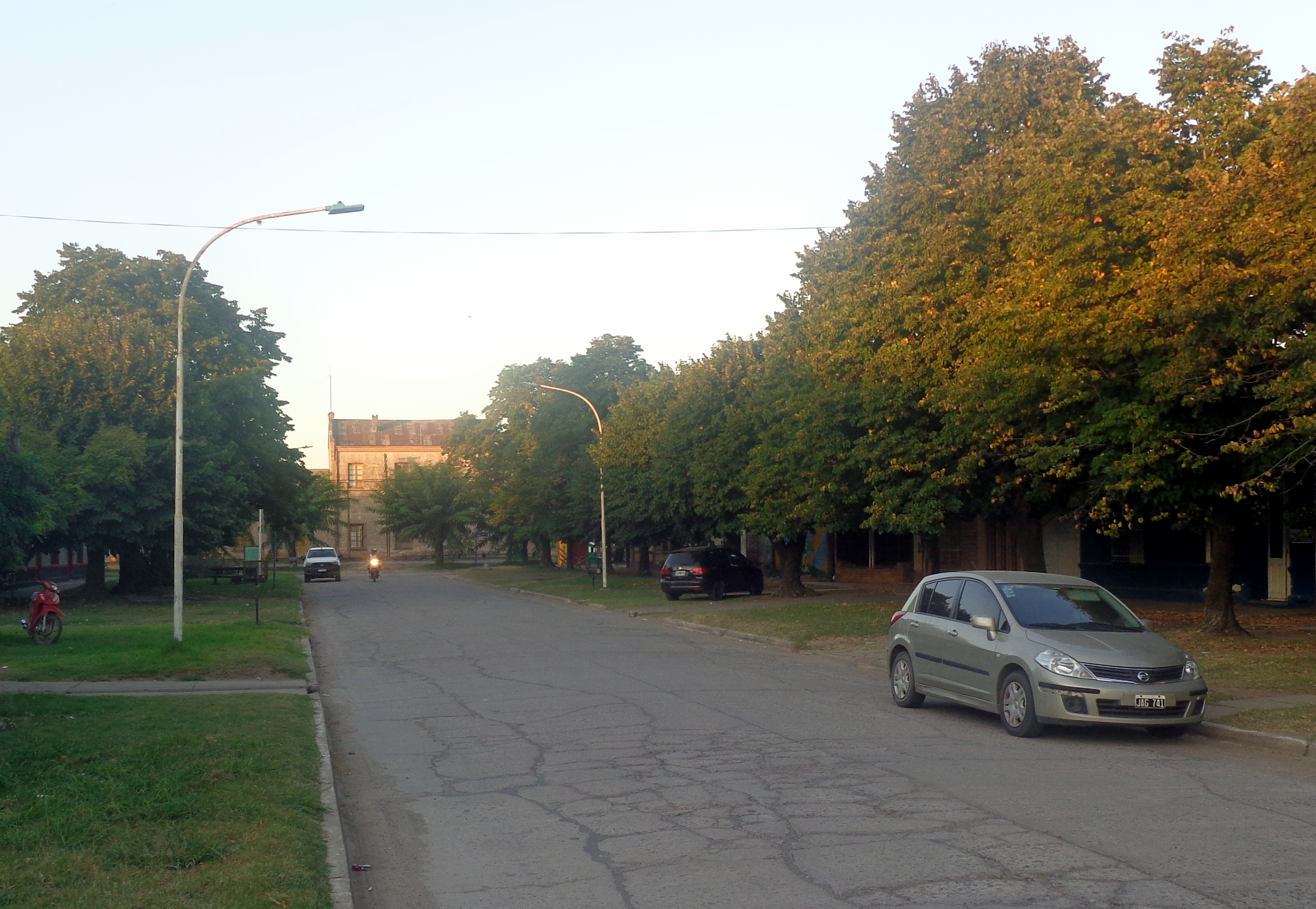

- Location within Buenos Aires Province
- Coordinates: 33°52′S 59°52′W
- Country: Argentina
- Province: Buenos Aires
- Partidos: San Pedro
- Elevation: 52 m (171 ft)

Population (2001 Census)
  - Total: 2,352
- Time zone: UTC−3 (ART)
- CPA Base: B 2935
- Area code: +291 457-XXXX
- Climate: Dfc

Santa Lucía is a town located in the San Pedro Partido in the province of Buenos Aires, Argentina. It was primarily settled by immigrants of Spanish and Irish origin.

== Geography ==
Santa Lucía is located 37 km (23 mi) from the town of San Pedro and 191 km (119 mi) from the city of Buenos Aires.

== Population ==
Santa Lucía had a population of 2,352 as of the 2001 census.

== Attractions ==
The Vocational Theater Group of Santa Lucía operates in the town, formerly operating out of the historic San Martín Theater Room before its demolition in 2010.
