= Los Sarmientos, La Rioja =

Coordinates: 29°08′54″S 67°29′00″W

Los Sarmientos (La Rioja)
- Municipality and village
- Interactive map of Los Sarmientos (La Rioja)
- Country: Argentina
- Province: La Rioja Province
- Time zone: UTC−3 (ART)
- Climate: BWk

Los Sarmientos (La Rioja) is a municipality and village in La Rioja Province in northwestern Argentina.
