= San Miguel, La Rioja =

Coordinates: 29°11′S 67°28′W

San Miguel (La Rioja)
- Municipality and village
- Interactive map of San Miguel (La Rioja)
- Country: Argentina
- Province: La Rioja Province
- Time zone: UTC−3 (ART)
- Climate: BWh

San Miguel (La Rioja) is a municipality and village in La Rioja Province in northwestern Argentina.
