= Río Tala =

- Town
- Location within Buenos Aires Province
- Coordinates: 33°46′10″S 59°38′15″W
- Country: Argentina
- Province: Buenos Aires
- Partidos: San Pedro
- Elevation: 15 m (49 ft)

Population (2001 Census)
  - Total: 1,681
- Time zone: UTC−3 (ART)
- CPA Base: B 2944
- Climate: Dfc

Río Tala is a town located in the San Pedro Partido in the province of Buenos Aires, Argentina.

== History ==
Before colonization, the area that now makes up the town was inhabited by the Querandí peoples. Rail service arrived in the area in 1885, following the construction of a train station.

The fossils of numerous mammals from the Pleistocene have been discovered near the town.

== Population ==
According to INDEC, which collects population data for the country, the town had a population of 1,681 people as of the 2001 census.
