= Mariano H. Alfonzo =

- Town
- Location within Buenos Aires Province
- Coordinates: 33°53′S 60°50′W
- Country: Argentina
- Province: Buenos Aires
- Partidos: Pergamino
- Established: 1897
- Elevation: 64 m (210 ft)

Population (2001 Census)
  - Total: 929
- Time zone: UTC−3 (ART)
- CPA Base: B 2718
- Climate: Dfc

Mariano H. Alfonzo is a town located in the western edge of the Pergamino Partido in the province of Buenos Aires, Argentina. The town was founded in 1897 as "Alfonso".

== Geography ==
Mariano H. Alfonzo is located 25 km (16 mi) from the regional capital of Pergamino.

== History ==
On February 23, 1897, the Argentine government named a rail station in what would become the town as "Alfonso", in honor of the man who had owned the land, also named Mariano H. Alfonzo. Alfonzo had previously agreed to sell a portion of his land in 1889 for the construction of the station. Shortly after this, Alfonzo sold his land and moved to Buenos Aires, where he died in 1913. Rail service between Colón and Pergamino began in December of that year. The town was laid out in 1910.

Between 1924 and 1931, the town sold around 80 lots to new settlers. In 1945, the Argentine government renamed the town to its current name, again in honor of Alfonzo.

Mariano was settled by large numbers of Irish immigrants, including one man, Tomás J. Kearney, who unsuccessfully attempted to establish a town named "San Patricio" in the area, in honor of the Irish saint. In 1926, a chapel was completed in the town, which was consecrated in honor of Saint Patrick. In the middle of the 20th century, the town contained a hotel, alongside various bakeries and shops.

In the 1960s, dispute emerged over whether the town was located in the Rojas or Pergamino partido. The dispute originated from land division practices that occurred around a century earlier. On January 4, 1967, the town was ceded to the Pergamino partido.

In 2025, the Argentine government relinquished control of the town's railway station.

== Economy ==
Because of the town's rail connections, Alfonzo became a center for livestock, where cattle bred in the area would then be sent on rail cars to slaughterhouses in larger cities across the country.

== Population ==
According to INDEC, which collects population data for the country, the town had a population of 929 people as of the 2001 census.
