= Pueblo Doyle =

- Town
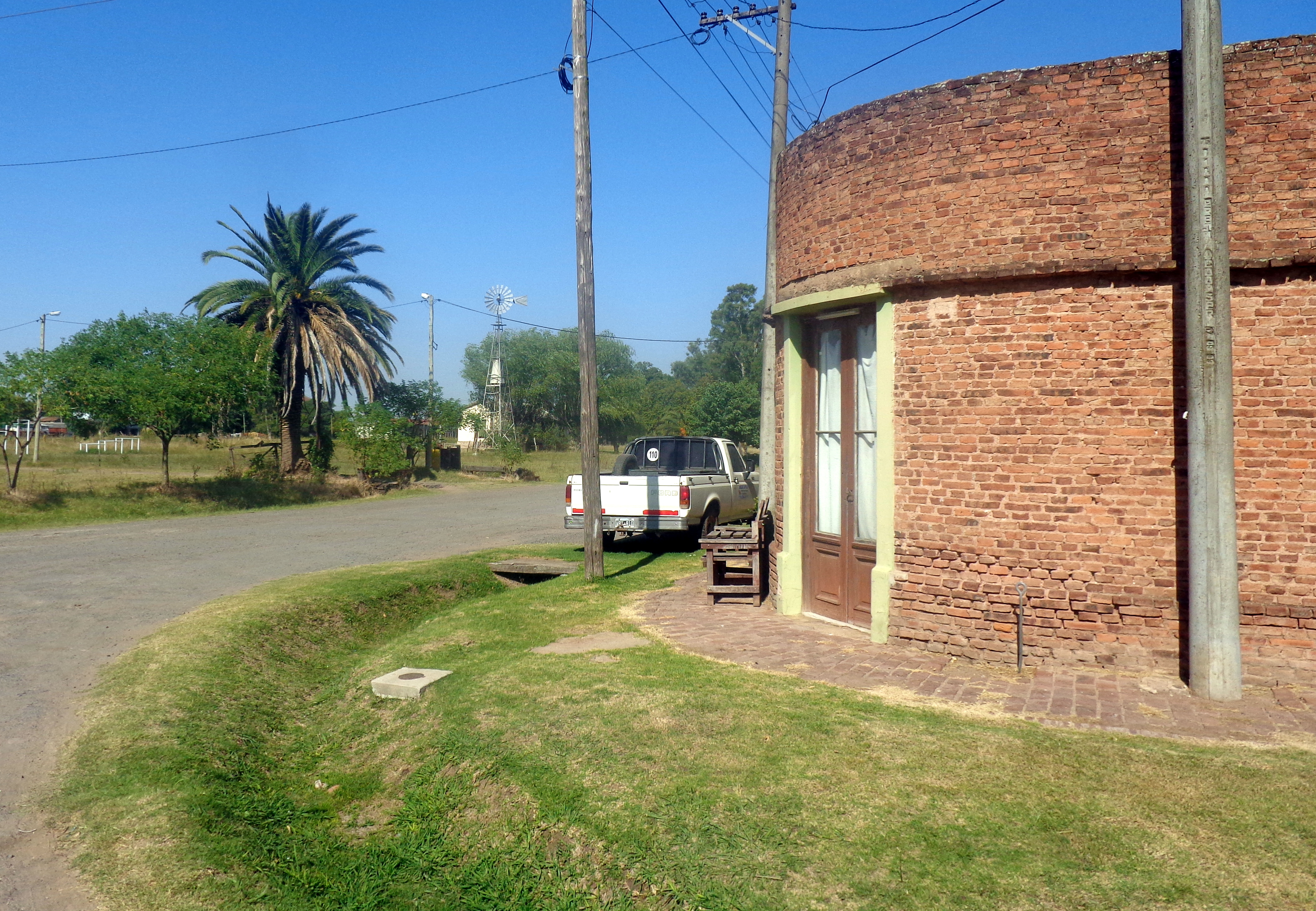

- Location within Buenos Aires Province
- Coordinates: 33°54′18″S 59°49′18″W
- Country: Argentina
- Province: Buenos Aires
- Partidos: San Pedro
- Elevation: 53 m (174 ft)

Population (2001 Census)
  - Total: 474
- Time zone: UTC−3 (ART)
- CPA Base: B 2935
- Climate: Dfc

Pueblo Doyle is a town located in the San Pedro Partido in the province of Buenos Aires, Argentina.

== Name ==
The town was named after Eduardo Doyle, who worked as a doctor in rural parts of the country.

== Geography ==
Pueblo Doyle is located 23 km (14 mi) from the town of San Pedro, the administrative center of the partido, and 150 km (93 mi) from the city of Pilar.

== History ==
Rail service under the Belgrano Railway arrived in the town in the 1940s.

== Economy ==
The economy of Pueblo Doyle is primarily based on agriculture, including livestock.

== Population ==
According to INDEC, which collects population data for the country, the town had a population of 474 people as of the 2001 census.
