= Vichigasta =

Coordinates: 29.4866°S 67.5061°W

- Municipality and village
- Interactive map of Vichigasta
- Country: Argentina
- Province: La Rioja Province
- Department: Chilecito

Population (2010)
  - Total: 3,016
- Time zone: UTC−3 (ART)

Vichigasta is a municipality and village within the Chilecito Department of La Rioja Province in northwestern Argentina. It is situated immediately east of the smaller village of Colonia Vichigasta.
