= San Pedro Partido =

San Pedro Partido de San Pedro
- Department
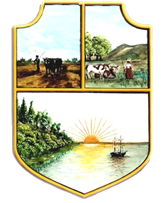
- Coat of arms

- location of San Pedro Partido in Buenos Aires Province
- Coordinates: 33°40′S 59°40′W
- Country: Argentina
- Established: December 30, 1784
- Founder: ?
- Seat: San Pedro

Government
  - Intendant: Cecilio Salazar (Union for the Homeland)

Area
  - Total: 1,322 km^{2} (510 sq mi)

Population
  - Total: 55,234
  - Density: 41.78/km^{2} (108.2/sq mi)
- Demonym: sanpedrina/o
- Postal Code: B2930
- IFAM: BUE118
- Area Code: o3329
- Patron saint: San Pedro
- Website: www.sanpedro.gov.ar

San Pedro Partido is a partido located in the north of the Argentine province of Buenos Aires. Its capital city is San Pedro. With an area of 1,322 km^{2} (510 sq mi), the population of the partido was 55,234 (2001 census [INDEC]).

== Economy ==
The economy of San Pedro Partido is dominated by farming, and the main agricultural products include wheat, soybean and fruit.

Other sources of revenue include factories, service industries and ecotourism.

== Settlements ==
Shore of the Paraná River in San Pedro Partido

- San Pedro
- Santa Lucía
- Gobernador Castro
- Río Tala
- La Buena Moza
- Tablas
- Pueblo Doyle
- Puerto Obligado.

== Population ==
- Population 1991 › 48,851
- Population 2001 › 55,234
- Population 2010 › 59,036
