= Fontezuela =

- Town
- Location within Buenos Aires Province
- Coordinates: 33°55′S 60°28′W
- Country: Argentina
- Province: Buenos Aires
- Partidos: Pergamino
- Elevation: 5 m (16 ft)

Population (2001 Census)
  - Total: 253
- Time zone: UTC−3 (ART)
- CPA Base: B 2700
- Climate: Dfc

Fontezuela is a town located in the Pergamino Partido in the province of Buenos Aires, Argentina.

== History ==
The town received its name from a military uprising which occurred in 1815, known as the Fontezuela Uprising. In the 1970s, a cereal plant was constructed in the town, which provided a major boost to the local economy. Many utilities in Fontezuela, including water and natural gas, were only recently constructed.

The Fontezuela model field, designed to test modern farming techniques and plant hybrids, was constructed outside of the town in 1947 by Bayer, a German company. The facility currently employs over 300 people.

== Population ==
According to INDEC, which collects population data for the country, the town had a population of 253 people as of the 2001 census.
