= Villa Angélica =

- Town
- Location within Buenos Aires Province
- Coordinates: 33°39′49″S 60°42′31″W
- Country: Argentina
- Province: Buenos Aires
- Partidos: Pergamino
- Established: 1903
- Elevation: 66 m (217 ft)

Population (2001 Census)
  - Total: 1,194
- Time zone: UTC−3 (ART)
- CPA Base: B 2715
- Climate: Dfc

Villa Angélica, also known as El Socorro, is a town located in the Pergamino Partido in the province of Buenos Aires, Argentina.

== Geography ==
Villa Angélica is located 29 km (18 mi) from the regional center of Pergamino, and 259 km (161 mi) from the city of Buenos Aires.

== History ==
A railway station was built by the Central Argentine Railway in what would become the town in 1890; it was named "El Socorro" by the former landowner of the station. The town was formally incorporated in 1909. Its second name, Villa Angélica, was given by the town's founder, Manuel Ocampo, in honor of his wife. Many of the town earliest settlers were immigrants from Southern Europe. A movie theater, possibly one of the oldest in rural Argentina, was built in 1910 and operated until 1985. A church was constructed in the town in 1921.

The economy of the town is primarily based on agriculture. Villa Angélica largely lacks modern gas and sewer services.

== Population ==
According to INDEC, which collects population data for the country, the town had a population of 1,194 people as of the 2001 census.
