= Santa Florentina =

Coordinates: 29°08′S 67°34′W

Santa Florentina (La Rioja)
- Municipality and village
- Interactive map of Santa Florentina (La Rioja)
- Country: Argentina
- Province: La Rioja Province
- Department: Chilecito
- Elevation: 4,623 ft (1,409 m)

Population (2010)
  - Total: 129
- Time zone: UTC−3 (ART)

Santa Florentina (La Rioja) is a municipality and village within the Chilecito Department of La Rioja Province in northwestern Argentina.
