= Guanchín =

Coordinates: 29°10′48″S 67°38′35″W

- Municipality and village
- Interactive map of Guanchín
- Country: Argentina
- Province: La Rioja Province
- Time zone: UTC−3 (ART)
- Climate: BWk

Guanchín is a municipality and village in La Rioja Province in northwestern Argentina.
