= Pergamino Partido =

Pergamino Partido de Pergamino
- Department
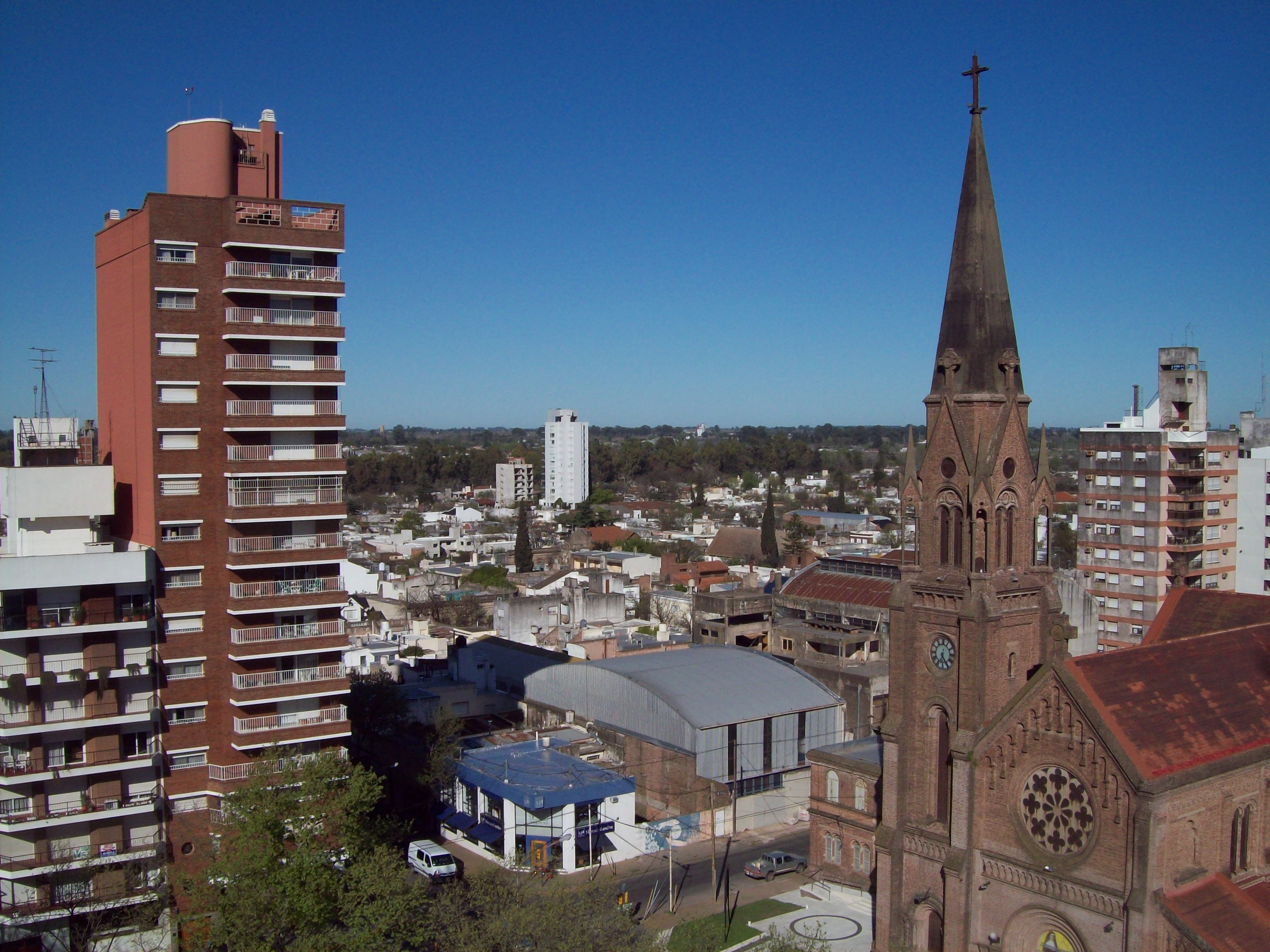

- location of Pergamino Partido in Buenos Aires Province
- Coordinates: 33°53′S 60°35′W
- Country: Argentina
- Established: 1626
- Founder: ?
- Seat: Pergamino

Government
  - Intendant: Javier Martínez (PRO-JxC)

Area
  - Total: 2,950 km^{2} (1,140 sq mi)

Population
  - Total: 99,193
  - Density: 33.6/km^{2} (87.1/sq mi)
- Demonym: pergaminense
- Postal Code: B2700
- IFAM: BUE094
- Area Code: 02477
- Patron saint: Nuestra Señora de la Merced
- Website: www.pergamino.gov.ar

Pergamino Partido is a partido in the north of Buenos Aires Province in Argentina.

The provincial subdivision has a population of about 100,000 inhabitants in an area of 2,950 km^{2} (1,140 sq mi), and its capital city is Pergamino, which is around 225 km (140 mi) from Buenos Aires.

== Settlements ==
Pergamino has 23 cuarteles (districts):

1. Pergamino: capital
2. Francisco Ayerza
3. Ortíz Basualdo
4. Rancagua
5. Urquiza
6. Maguire
7. Villa Dafonte
8. Fontezuela
9. Manantiales Grande
10. Manantiales Chico
11. La Violeta
12. Pujol
13. Guerrico
14. Manuel Ocampo
15. Colonia Buena Vista
16. J.A. de la Peña
17. Acevedo
18. Mariano Benítez
19. Villa Angélica
20. Arroyo del Medio
21. Colonia Santa Rosa
22. Mariano H. Alfonzo
23. Pinzón
