= Tilimuqui =

Coordinates: 29°08′S 67°25′W

- Municipality and village
- Interactive map of Tilimuqui
- Country: Argentina
- Province: La Rioja Province
- Time zone: UTC−3 (ART)

Tilimuqui is a municipality and village in La Rioja Province in northwestern Argentina.
