= Acevedo, Buenos Aires =

Acevedo
- Town
- Location within Buenos Aires Province
- Coordinates: 33°45′18″S 60°26′22″W
- Country: Argentina
- Province: Buenos Aires
- Partidos: Pergamino
- Established: 1744
- Elevation: 58 m (190 ft)

Population (2001 Census)
  - Total: 1,558
- Time zone: UTC−3 (ART)
- CPA Base: B 2717
- Climate: Dfc

Acevedo is a town located in the Pergamino Partido in the province of Buenos Aires, Argentina. It is the oldest settlement in the partido.

== History ==
The area that makes up Acevedo was first settled in 1744 by a sergeant named Pedro de Acevedo. In the late 19th century, several businesses began to be added to the town. A church in the town was constructed in 1899.

== Economy ==
The town is primarily agricultural, being a center of livestock as well as vegetables, wheat, corn and cereals.

== Population ==
According to INDEC, which collects population data for the country, the town had a population of 1,558 people as of the 2001 census.
