= Malligasta =

Coordinates: 29°11′S 67°26′W

- Municipality and village
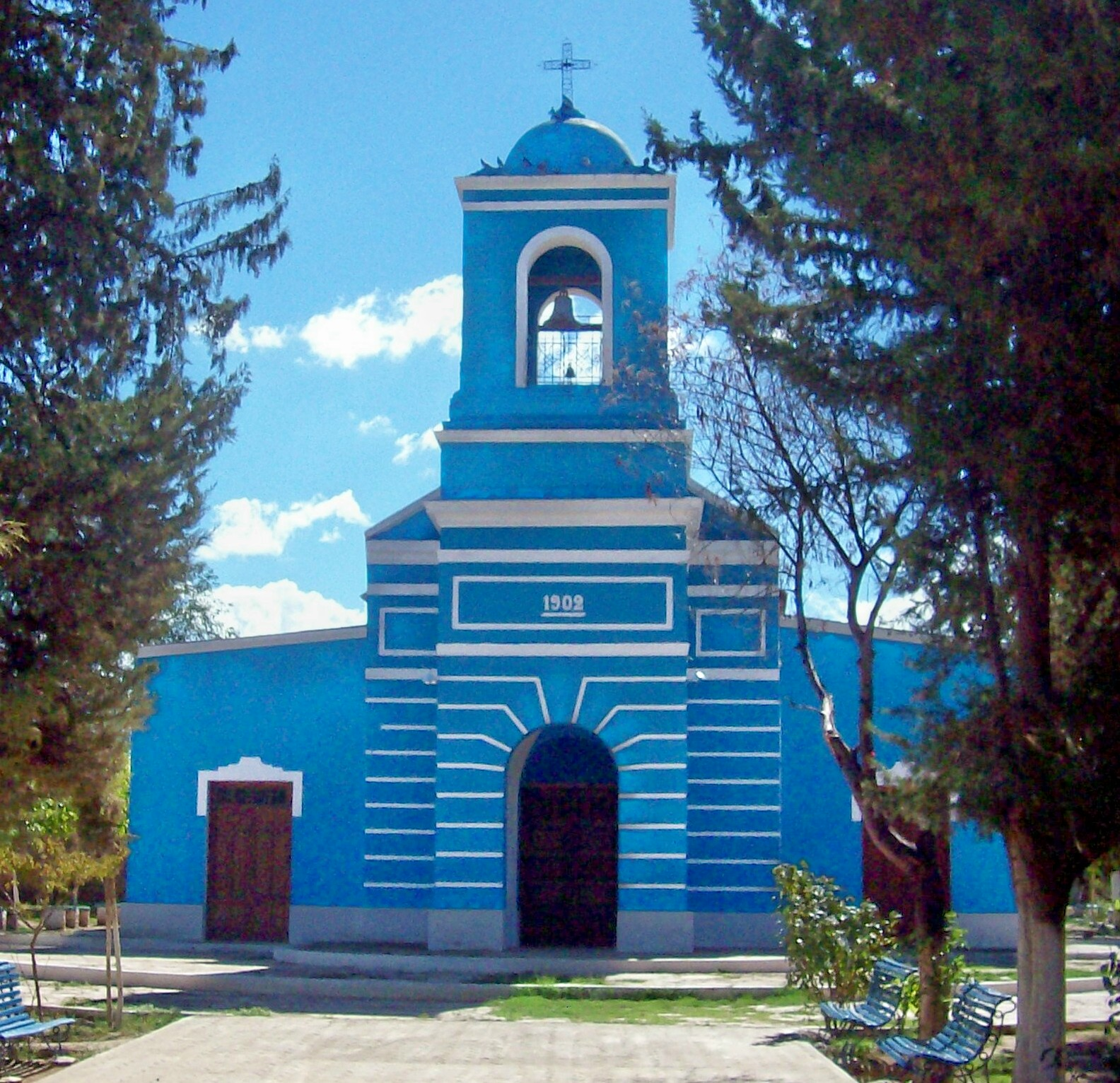
- Interactive map of Malligasta
- Country: Argentina
- Province: La Rioja Province
- Time zone: UTC−3 (ART)

Malligasta is a municipality and village in La Rioja Province in northwestern Argentina.
