= Quilmes Partido =

Quilmes Partido Partido de Quilmes
- Department
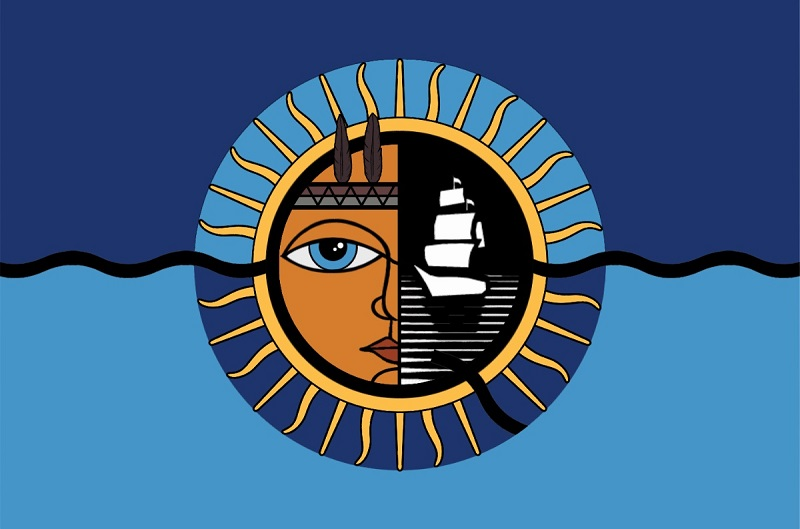
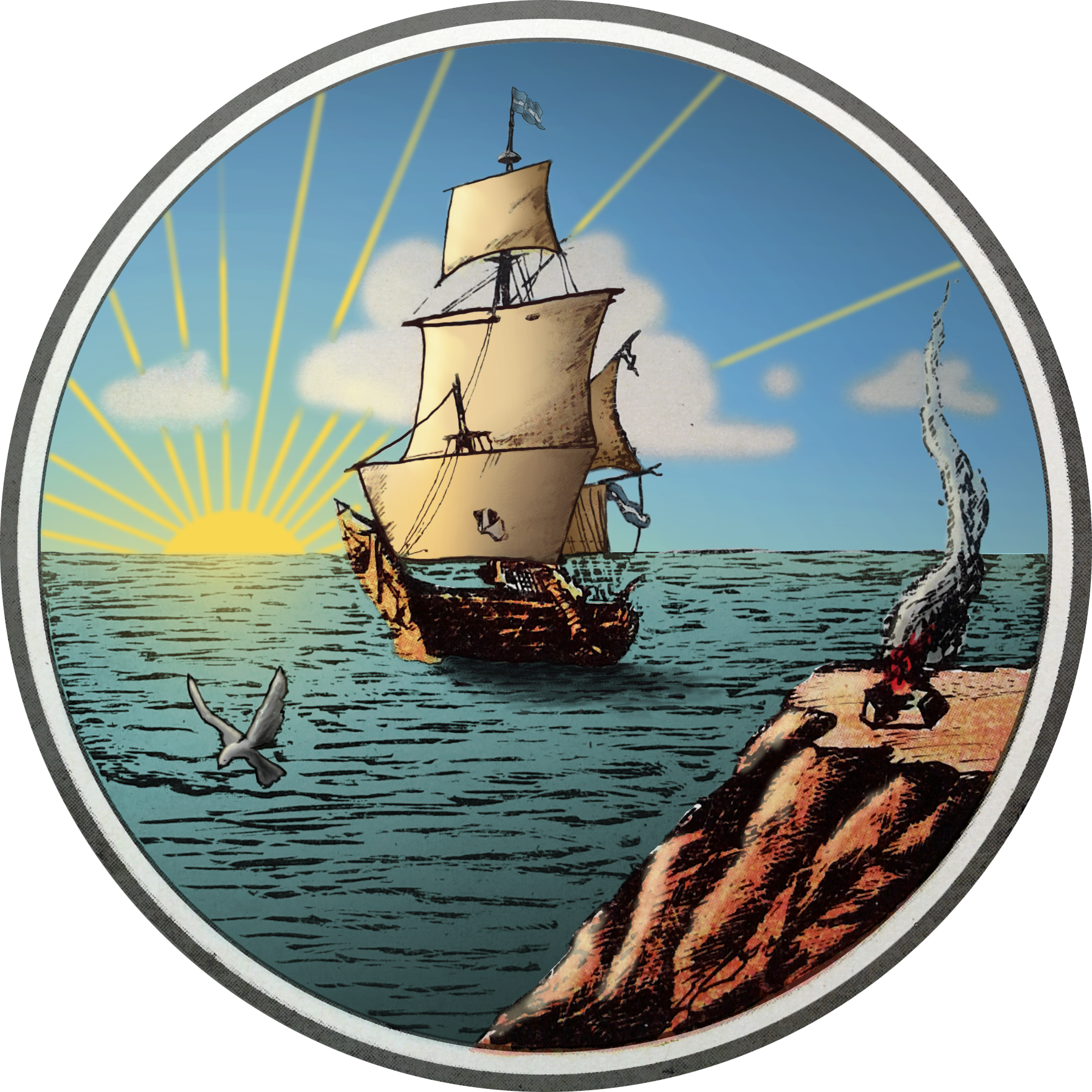
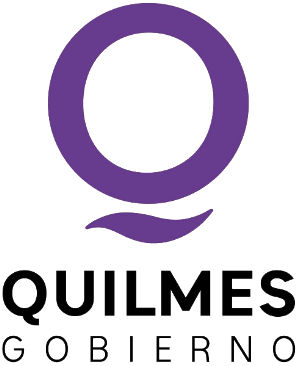
- Flag Seal Logo

- location of Quilmes Partido in Greater Buenos Aires
- Coordinates: 34°43′S 58°16′W
- Country: Argentina
- Established: August 14th, 1812
- Founded by: First Triumvirate decree
- Seat: Quilmes

Government
  - Intendant: Mayra Mendoza (Homeland Force)

Area
  - Total: 125 km^{2} (48 sq mi)

Population
  - Total: 580,829
  - Density: 4,650/km^{2} (12,000/sq mi)
- Demonym: quilmense "quilmeño/a"
- Postal Code: B1876, B1878, B1879, B1881, B1882
- IFAM: BUE101
- Area Code: 011
- Patron saint: Exaltation of the Holy Cross (14 september)
- Website: www.quilmes.gov.ar

Quilmes is a partido of Buenos Aires Province, Argentina, within the Greater Buenos Aires conurbation.

It has an area of 125 square kilometres (48 sq mi), and a population of 580,829 (2010 census [INDEC]), making it the third-most populous partido in Greater Buenos Aires. Named after the Quilmes tribe, its capital is the city of Quilmes.

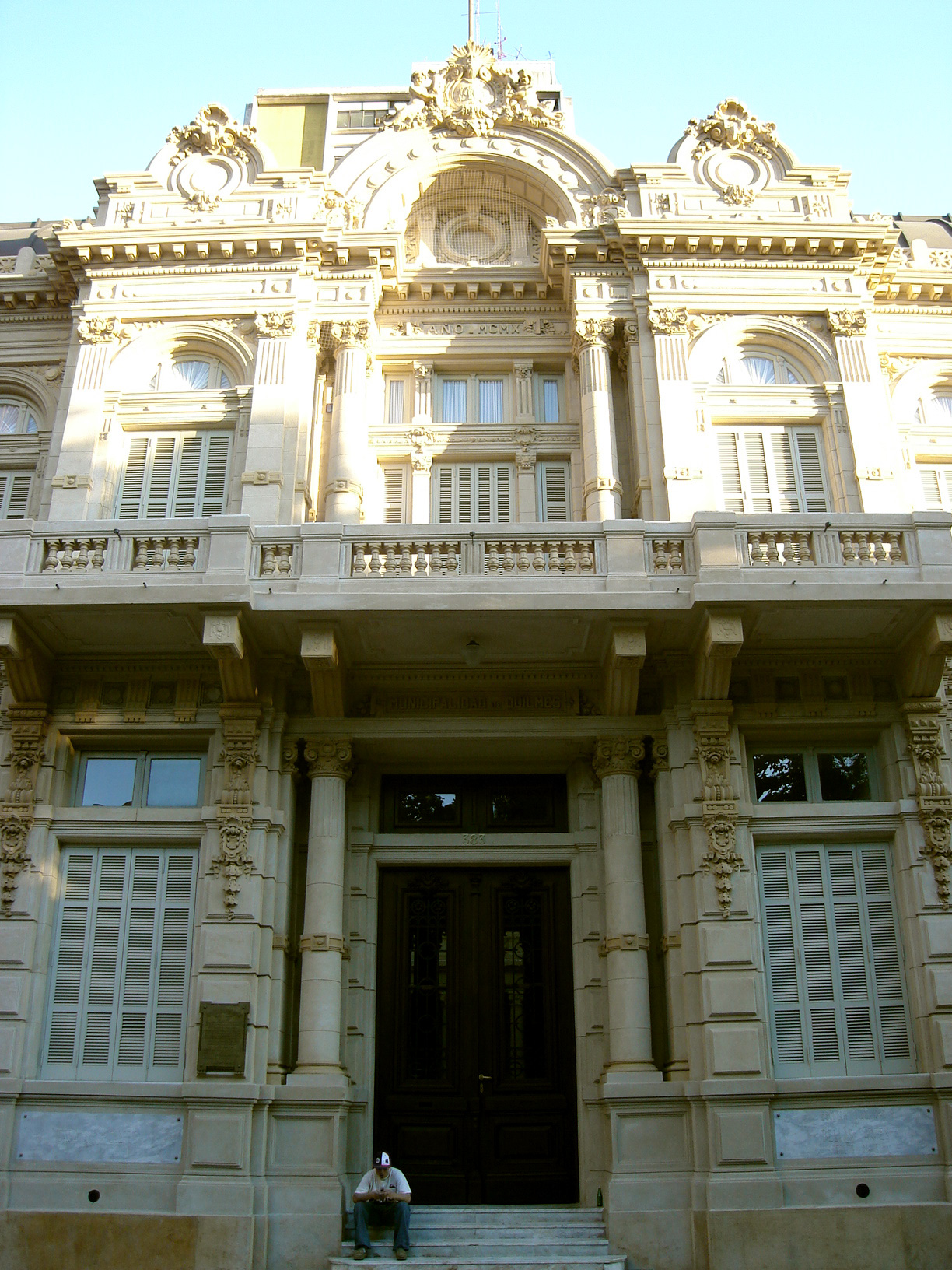
Quilmes Municipal Building (town hall)

== Beer ==
Quilmes gives its name to one of Argentina's beers, Cerveza Quilmes, which was originally brewed in the area.

== Sport ==
Quilmes is home to two football clubs, Quilmes Atlético Club of the Primera Division and Club Atlético Argentino de Quilmes of the regionalised 5th Division. The city also stands out in many other sports, including field hockey, basketball and rugby, among others.

== Christianity ==
In 1666 was established the Cathedral of Quilmes (Catedral de Quilmes in Spanish). In 1976 a papal bull created the Diócesis de Quilmes. The first minister was Padre Obispo Jorge Novak, famous for his defense of Human Rights during the Proceso de Reorganización Nacional.

The first Rivers of Life Church ("Ríos de Vida" in Spanish) was established in Quilmes in 1967. It is a group of over 80 evangelical churches around the world. Rivers of Life, Quilmes has the largest congregation of all the Rivers of Life churches around the world.

Other notable evangelical churches include the Iglesia del Encuentro and the Iglesia del Puente.

== Districts (localidades) ==
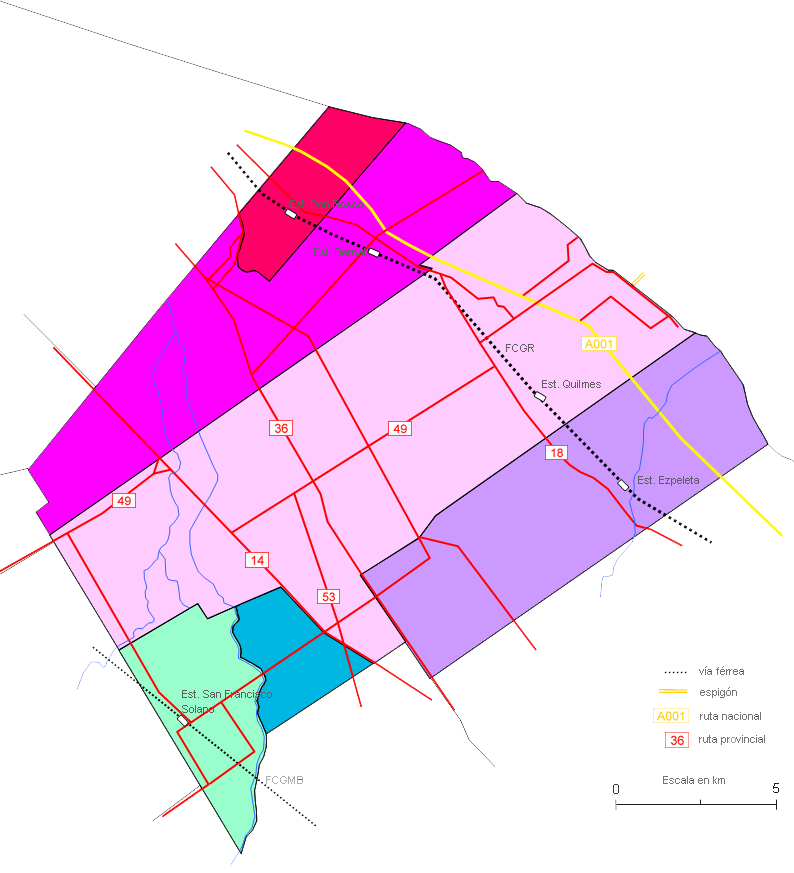

Districts of the Partido and its population

City	District	Inhabitants

Bernal	Bernal; West Bernal	33.415; 76.499
Don Bosco		20.876
Ezpeleta	Ezpeleta; West Ezpeleta	49.191; 23.366
Quilmes	Quilmes; West Quilmes	111.575; 119.235
San Francisco; Solano		53.363
Villa La Florida		31.268

Source: 2001 Census, INDEC and DPE (Provincial Direction of Statistics)
