= River of life =

River of life may refer to:

- River of the water of life from Revelation 22
- Rivers of Life
