= Javier Mazzoni =

Argentine footballer

Personal information
- Full name: Javier Gustavo Mazzoni
- Date of birth: 4 February 1972 (age 54)
- Place of birth: Don Bosco, Argentina
- Height: 1.81 m (5 ft 11 in)
- Position: Forward

Senior career*
Years	Team	Apps	(Gls)
1991–1994	Dock Sud		
1994–1996	Independiente		
1996–1999	Nantes	19	(1)
1999–2000	Lausanne		
2000–2003	Racing Santander	49	(16)
2002	→ Figueirense (loan)		
2003	Poli Ejido	16	(2)
2003–2004	Olimpo	10	(1)
2004–2005	Arsenal Sarandí	8	(0)
2005–2006	Montevideo Wanderers	20	(0)
2006–2007	Tigre		
- * Club domestic league appearances and goals

Javier Gustavo Mazzoni (born 4 February 1972) is an Argentine retired footballer who played as a forward.

== Football career ==
Born in Don Bosco, Buenos Aires, Mazzoni had a journeyman career after starting out at Club Atlético Independiente, going on to play top division football other than in his country with FC Nantes (France), FC Lausanne-Sport (Switzerland), Racing de Santander (Spain), Figueirense Futebol Clube (Brazil) and Montevideo Wanderers FC (Uruguay).

He retired in 2007, at the age of 35.

== Honours ==
Independiente

- Supercopa Libertadores: 1994, 1995
