= Villa Udaondo =

Town in Buenos Aires Province, Argentina

- Town
- Location in Greater Buenos Aires
- Coordinates: 34°37′00.7″S 58°41′35.8″W
- Country: Argentina
- Province: Buenos Aires
- Partido: Ituzaingó
- Founded: 1940
- Elevation: 19 m (62 ft)

Population (2001 census [INDEC])
  - Total: 31,490
  - Density: 1,812/km^{2} (4,690/sq mi)
- CPA Base: B 1713
- Area code: +54 11

Villa Gobernador Udaondo is a town in Buenos Aires Province, Argentina, it is located in the Ituzaingó Partido in Greater Buenos Aires.

The town is named after Guillermo Udaondo (14 December 1859 – 4 August 1922), Governor of Buenos Aires Province from 1894 to 1898.
