= Hurlingham Partido =

Hurlingham Partido de Hurlingham
- Department
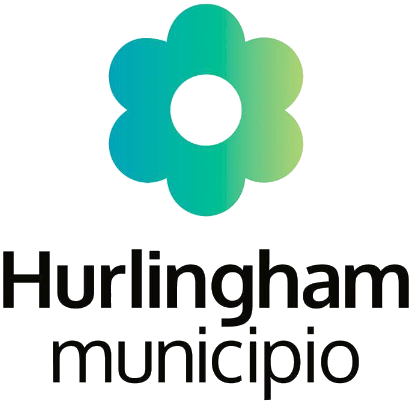
- Logo

- location of Hurlingham partido in Gran Buenos Aires
- Coordinates: 34°36′S 58°38′W
- Country: Argentina
- Established: December 28, 1994
- Founder: provincial law 11610
- Seat: Hurlingham

Government
  - Intendant: Damian Selci (PJ)

Area
  - Total: 35.43 km^{2} (13.68 sq mi)

Population
  - Total: 176,505
  - Density: 4,982/km^{2} (12,900/sq mi)
- Demonym: hurlinguense
- Postal Code: B1686
- IFAM: BUE060
- Area Code: 011
- Patron saint: Nuestra Señora de la Guardia
- Website: www.hurlingham.gob.ar

Hurlingham Partido is a partido of Buenos Aires Province, Argentina. It is in the Greater Buenos Aires urban area.

The provincial subdivision has a population of about 176,505 inhabitants in an area of 35.43 km^{2} (13.7 sq mi), and its capital city is Hurlingham, which is 23 km (14.3 mi) from Buenos Aires. Hurlingham is known for the Hurlingham Club, a sports and polo club named after the Hurlingham Club in Fulham, England.

== Districts ==
- Hurlingham, Buenos Aires
- William C. Morris, Buenos Aires
- Villa Tesei
