= Greater Buenos Aires =

Urban agglomeration in Argentina

- Metropolitan area
- Buenos Aires Metropolitan Area; Área Metropolitana de Buenos Airess
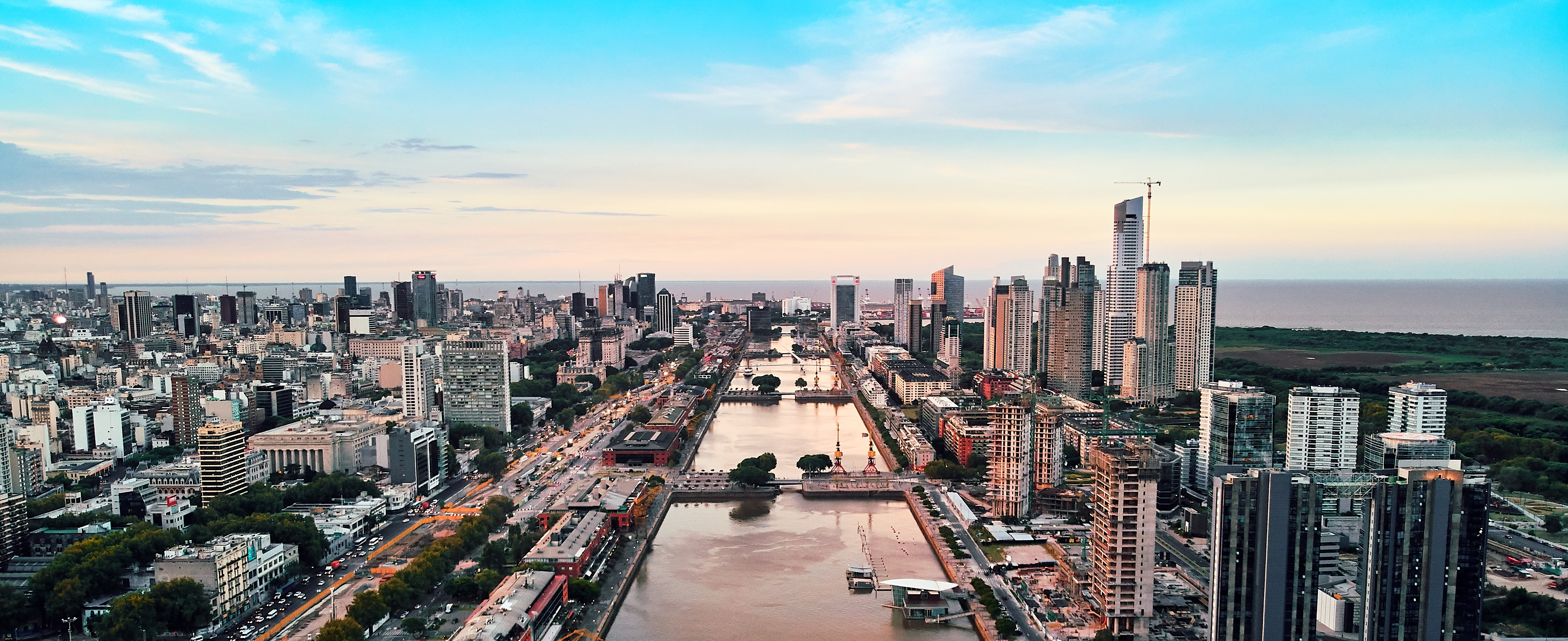
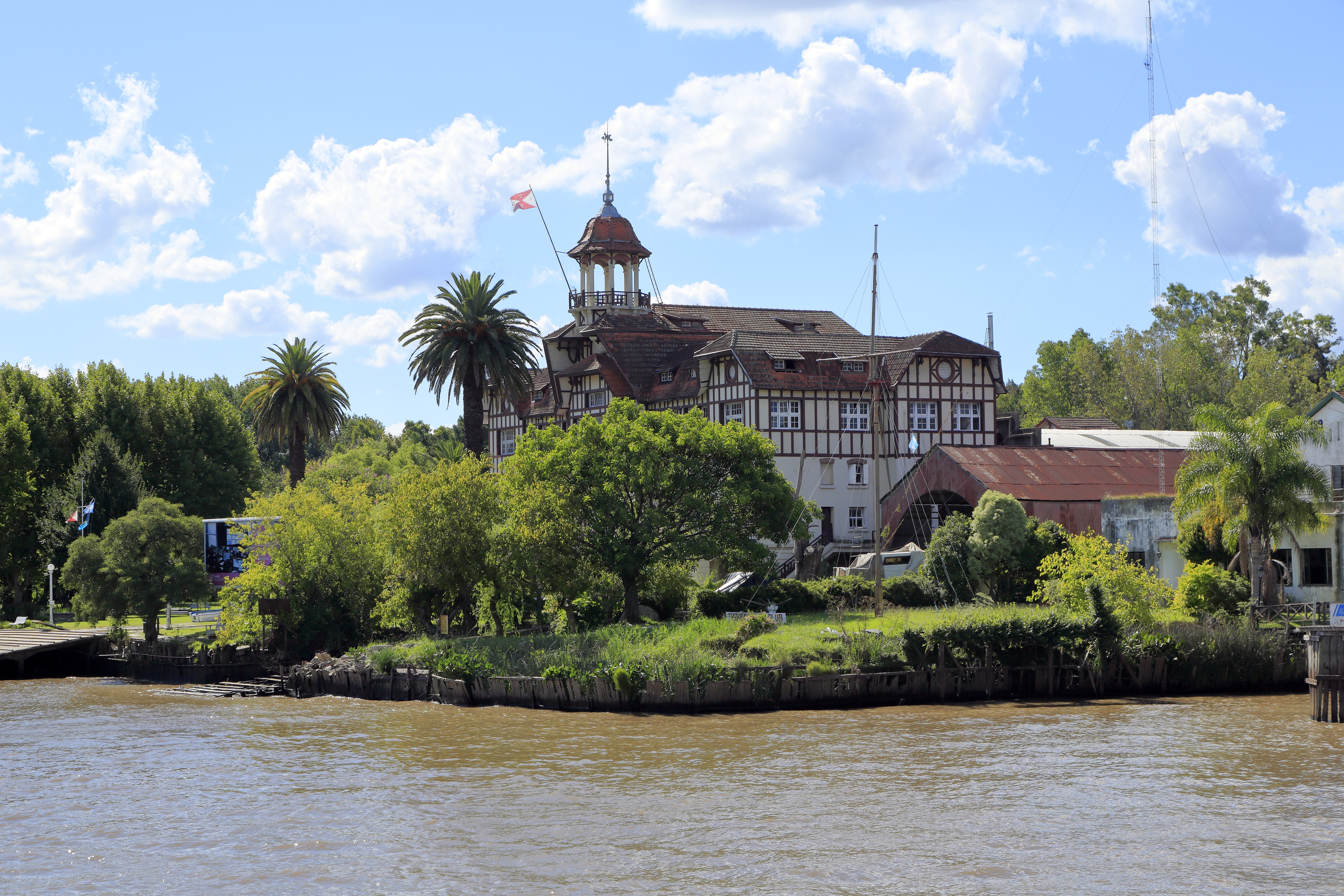
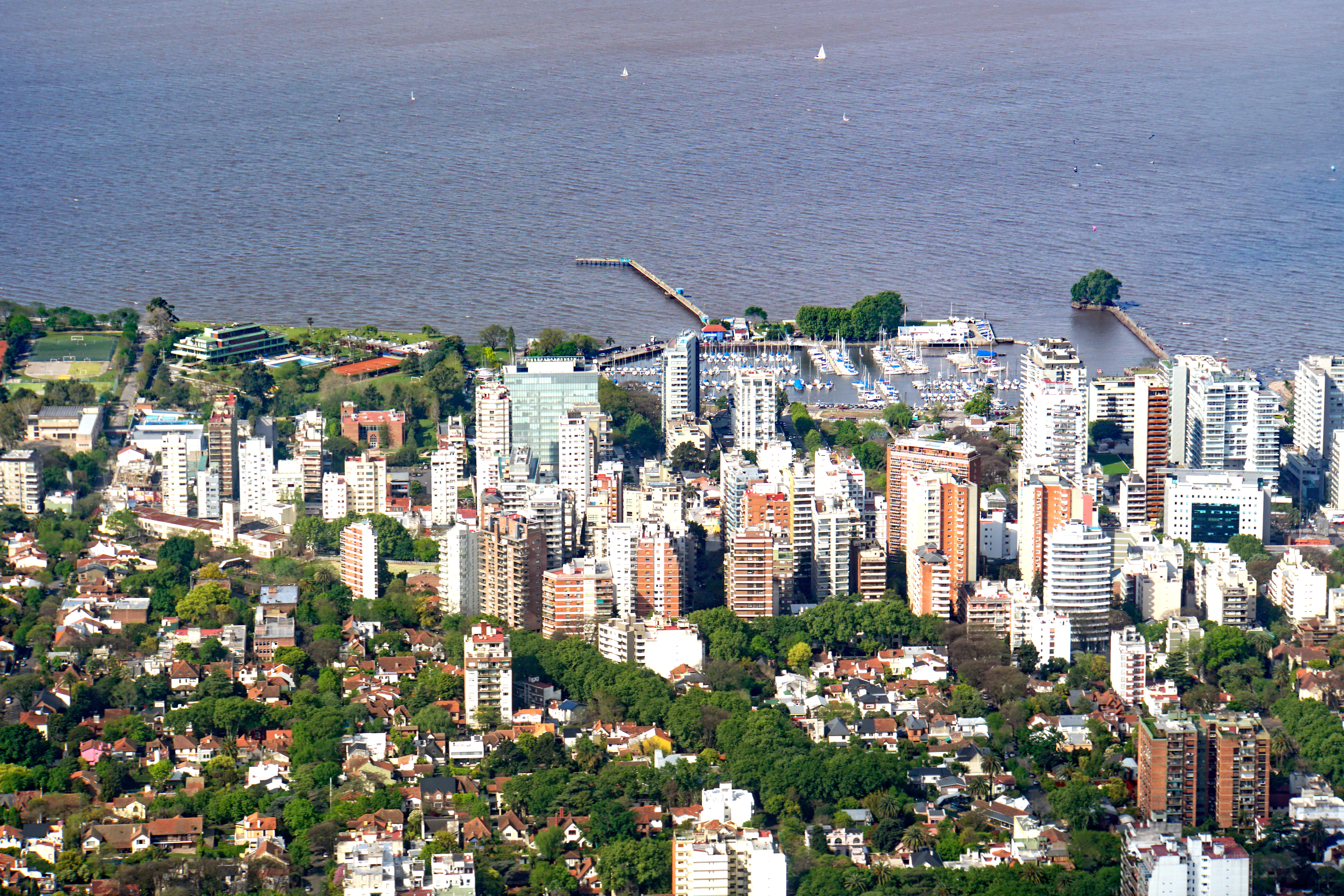
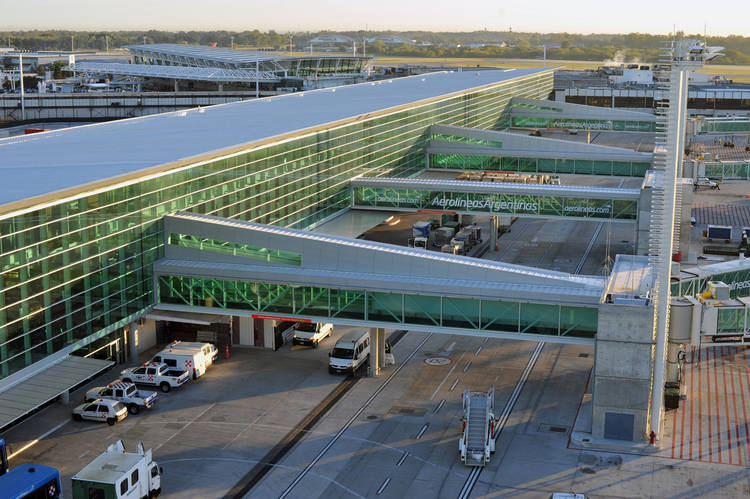
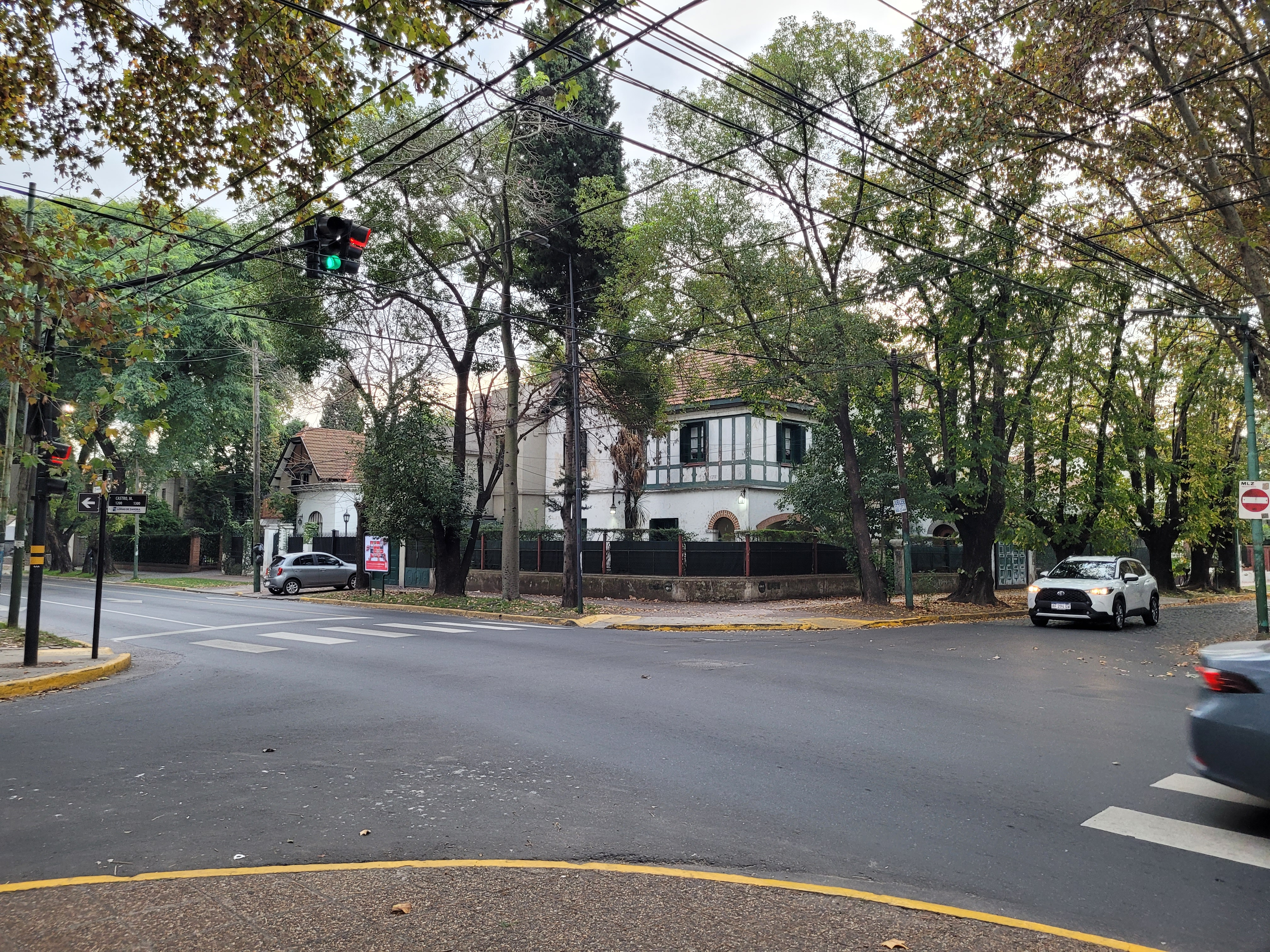
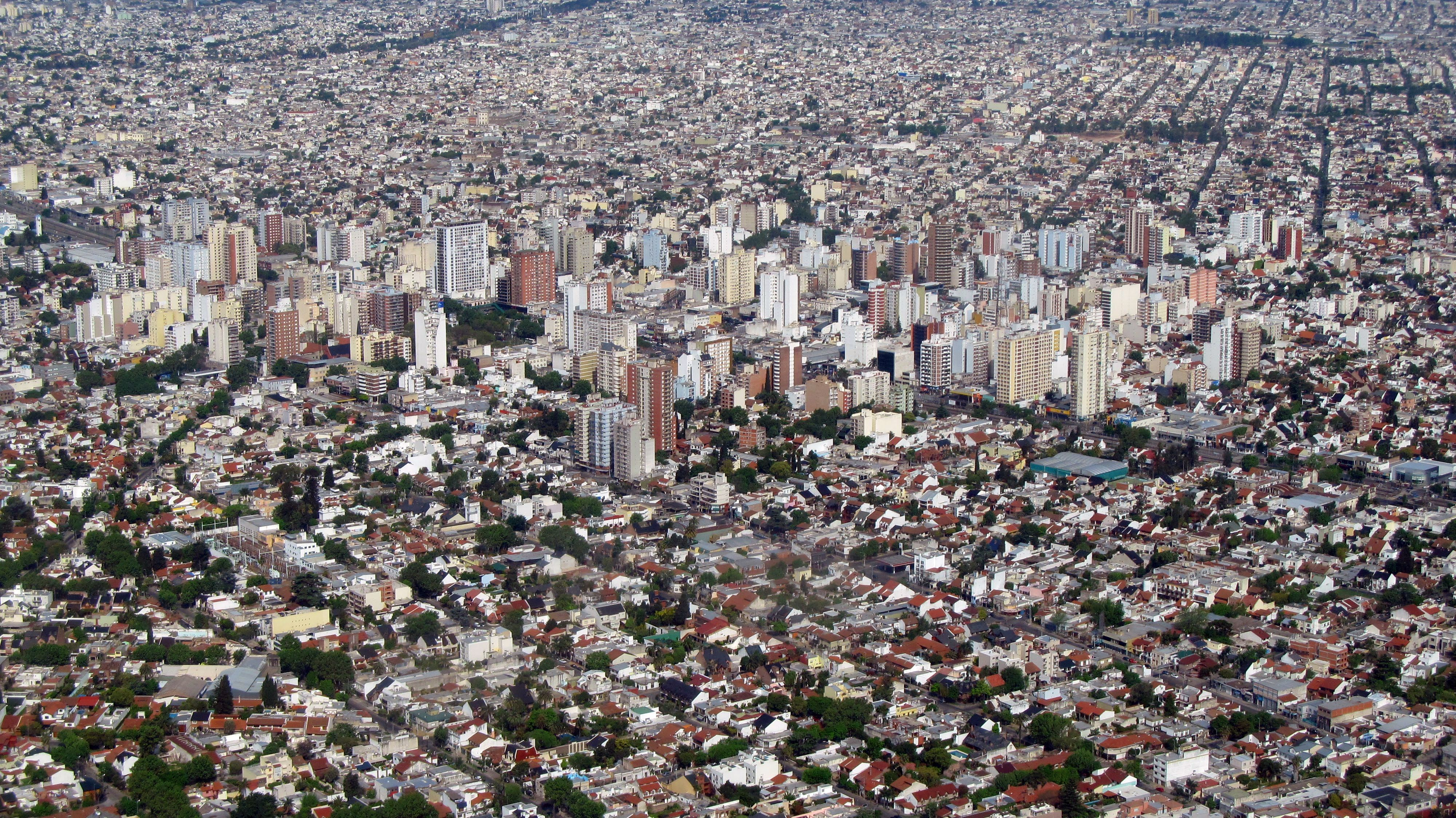
- Skyline of Puerto Madero, Buenos Aires City La Marina Rowing Club in Tigre Aerial view of Olivos, Vicente López Ezeiza International Airport in Ezeiza Street in Banfield, Lomas de Zamora Aerial view of Ramos Mejía in La Matanza, the most populous suburb

- Map of Greater Buenos Aires; Autonomous City of Buenos Aires; 24 official partidos of Buenos Aires; Partidos sometimes included
- Country: Argentina
- Core city: Buenos Aires

Area
  - Metro: 3,833 km^{2} (1,480 sq mi)

Population (INDEC 2022 Census)
  - Metropolitan area: 10,865,182 (24 partidos)
  - Metro: 13,985,794 (including the Federal District and 24 partidos) 16,484,772 (including 15 additional partidos - which also includes Greater La Plata's 938,287)
  - Metro density: 3,926.1/km^{2} (10,169/sq mi)

GDP
  - Metro: $235.6 billion (2023)
  - Per capita: $15,200 (2023)

Greater Buenos Aires (Spanish: Gran Buenos Aires, GBA), also known as the Buenos Aires Metropolitan Area (Spanish: Área Metropolitana de Buenos Aires, AMBA), refers to the urban agglomeration comprising the Autonomous City of Buenos Aires (CABA), and the adjacent 24 partidos (counties) in the Province of Buenos Aires (together known as "Conurbano"). Thus, it does not constitute a single administrative unit. The conurbation spreads south, west and north of Buenos Aires city. To the east, the River Plate serves as a natural boundary.

The term is also related to other expressions that are not necessarily well defined: the "Buenos Aires conurbation" (Conurbano Bonaerense); the "Greater Buenos Aires Agglomeration" (Aglomerado Gran Buenos Aires); and the "Metropolitan Area of Buenos Aires" (Área Metropolitana Buenos Aires, AMBA).

Colloquially, Argentines refer to the Conurbano Bonaerense as the set of 30 counties that surround the City of Buenos Aires and which are mostly populated by working-class or middle-class communities.

== History ==
The term Gran Buenos Aires ("Greater Buenos Aires") was first officially used in 1948, when Domingo Mercante, the Governor of Buenos Aires Province, signed a bill delineating as such an area covering 14 municipalities surrounding the City of Buenos Aires.

Urban sprawl, especially between 1945 and 1980, created a vast metropolitan area of over 3,800 km² (1,500 mi²) – or 19 times the area of Buenos Aires proper. The 24 suburban partidos (counties) grew more than sixfold in population between the 1947 and 2022 censuses – or nearly 2.5% annually, compared to 1.4% for the nation as a whole.

While annual growth for the suburban area slowed to 0.8% between 2010 and 2022, the 12 million inhabitants in the entire 30-county area - plus the City of Buenos Aires (3 million) - account for a third of the total population of Argentina and generate nearly half (48%) of the country's GDP.

As urbanization progressed and the metro area grew in both area and density, six additional partially urbanized partidos (totaling 1,062,991 population as of the 2022 census) were added to the metropolitan area in 2006 by Law 13473 - which also adds neighboring Greater La Plata's 938,287 to the total.

== Definition ==
Population pyramid of Greater Buenos Aires in 2022

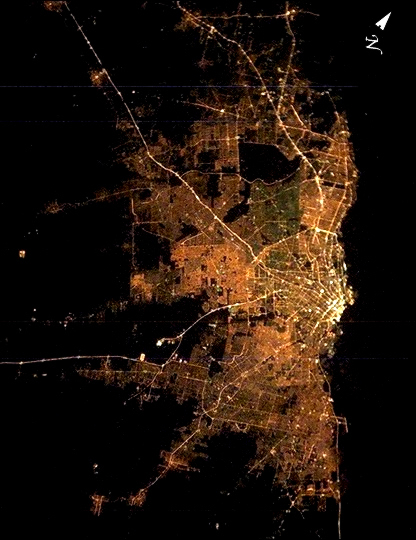
Satellite image of Greater Buenos Aires at night

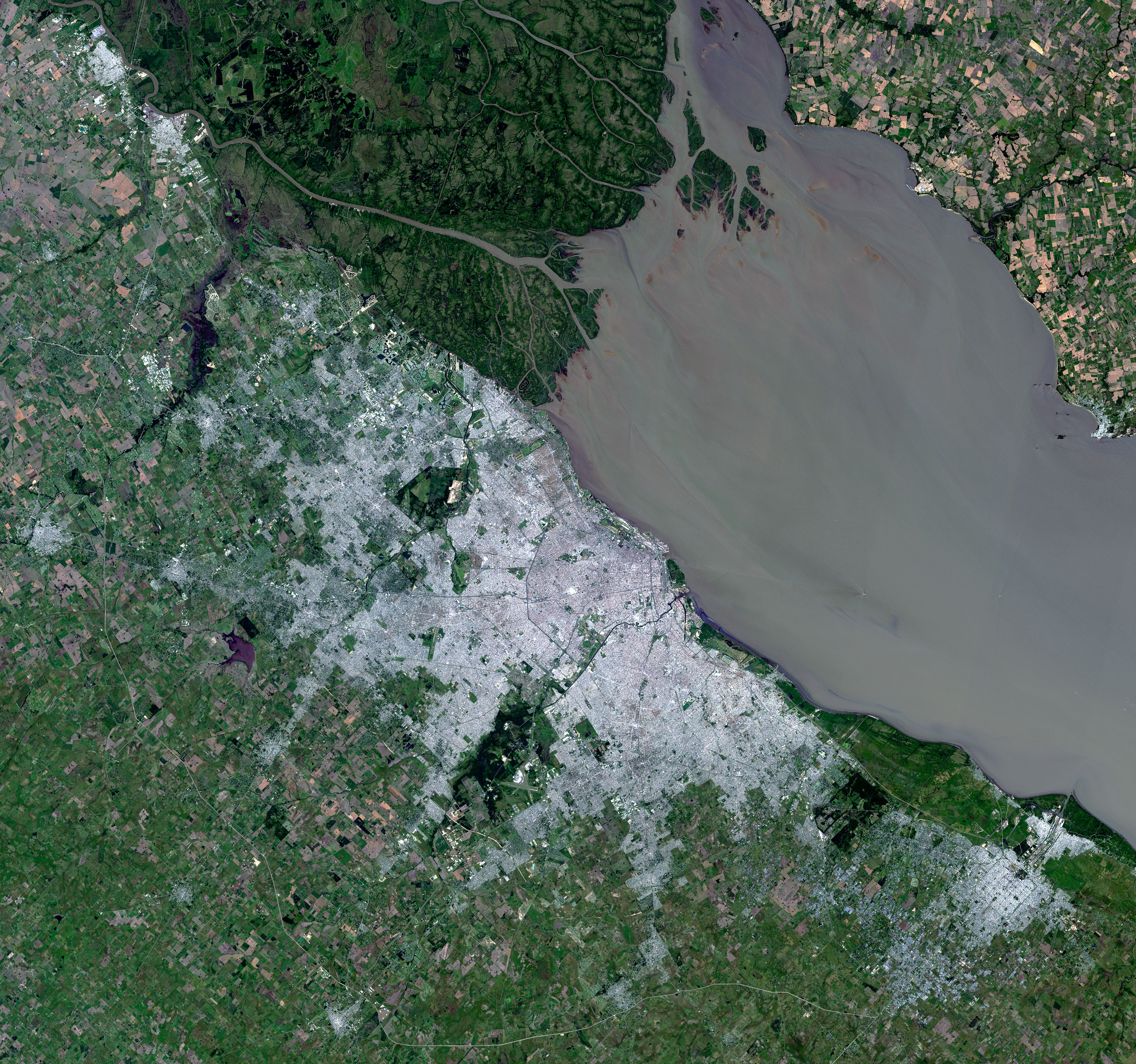
Buenos Aires, city, and vicinity, Landsat 8 satellite image

The National Institute of Statistics and Censuses (INDEC) has defined Greater Buenos Aires.

There are three main groups within the Buenos Aires conurbation. The first two groups (24 partidos) comprise the traditional conurbation - or the "conurbation proper" - while the third group of six partidos is in the process of becoming fully integrated with the rest.

Fourteen fully urbanized partidos

- Avellaneda
- General San Martín
- Hurlingham
- Ituzaingó
- José C. Paz
- Lanús
- Lomas de Zamora
- Malvinas Argentinas
- Morón
- Quilmes
- San Isidro
- San Miguel
- Tres de Febrero
- Vicente López

Ten partidos partially urbanized

- Almirante Brown
- Berazategui
- Esteban Echeverría
- Ezeiza
- Florencio Varela
- La Matanza
- Merlo
- Moreno
- San Fernando
- Tigre

Six partidos not yet conurbated

The six additional partially urbanized partidos added to the metropolitan area in 2006 by Law 13473 (which also adds Greater La Plata's 938,287 to the total) are:

- Escobar (256,449)
- General Rodríguez (143,211)
- Marcos Paz (67,154)
- Pilar (395,072)
- Presidente Perón (102,128)
- San Vicente (98,977)

The 2022 Census later included, for statistical purposes, these six outlying partidos (totaling 497,700):

- Brandsen (33,026)
- Campana (110,726)
- Cañuelas (71,149)
- Exaltación de la Cruz (39,347)
- Luján (111,365)
- Zárate (132,087)

== List of partidos ==
Rank	Partido	Seat	2010 Census	% growth from 2001 Census	2022 Census	% growth from 2010 Census
*	Buenos Aires		2,890,151	4.1	3,120,612	8.0
1	La Matanza	San Justo	1,775,816	41.5	1,837,774	3.5
2	Lomas de Zamora	Lomas de Zamora	616,279	4.2	694,330	12.7
3	Quilmes	Quilmes	582,943	12.4	636,026	9.1
4	Almirante Brown	Adrogué	552,902	7.2	585,852	6.0
5	Merlo	Merlo	528,494	12.4	580,806	9.9
6	Moreno	Moreno	452,505	18.9	574,374	26.9
7	Florencio Varela	Florencio Varela	426,005	22.1	497,818	16.9
8	Lanús	Lanús	459,263	1.4	462,051	0.6
9	General San Martín	San Martín	414,196	2.8	450,335	8.7
10	Tigre	Tigre	376,381	25.0	447,785	19.0
11	Avellaneda	Avellaneda	342,677	4.2	370,939	8.2
12	Tres de Febrero	Caseros	340,071	1.1	366,377	7.7
13	Berazategui	Berazategui	324,344	12.6	360,582	11.2
14	Malvinas Argentinas	Los Polvorines	322,375	10.9	351,788	9.1
15	Esteban Echeverría	Monte Grande	300,959	23.4	339,030	12.6
16	Morón	Morón	321,109	3.8	334,178	4.1
17	San Miguel	San Miguel	276,190	9.1	326,215	18.1
18	José C. Paz	José C. Paz	265,981	15.5	323,918	21.8
19	San Isidro	San Isidro	292,878	0.5	298,777	2.0
20	Vicente López	Olivos	269,420	-1.7	283,510	5.2
21	Ezeiza	Ezeiza	163,722	37.8	203,283	24.2
22	Hurlingham	Hurlingham	181,241	5.2	187,122	3.2
23	Ituzaingó	Ituzaingó	167,824	6.1	179,788	7.1
24	San Fernando	San Fernando	163,240	8.0	172,524	5.7

== List of cities ==
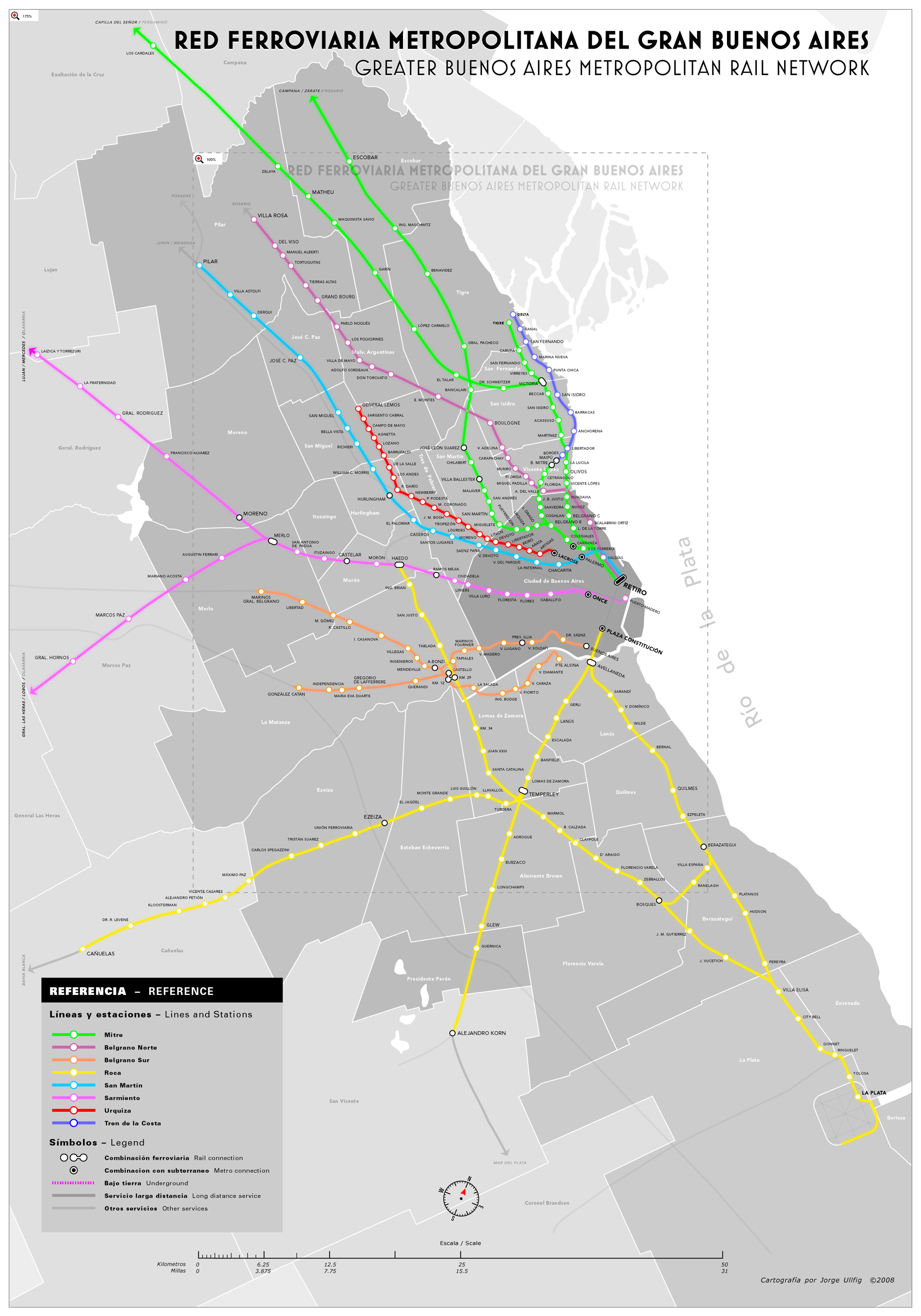
Greater Buenos Aires Metropolitan Rail Network

Rank	City	District	Partido	2001 Census
1	Buenos Aires	(Buenos Aires)		2,776,138
2	Merlo	(Buenos Aires Province)	Merlo	244,168
3	Quilmes	(Buenos Aires Province)	Quilmes	230,810
4	Banfield	(Buenos Aires Province)	Lomas de Zamora	223,898
5	José Clemente Paz	(Buenos Aires Province)	José Clemente Paz	216,637
6	Lanús	(Buenos Aires Province)	Lanús	212,152
7	Gregorio de Laferrère	(Buenos Aires Province)	La Matanza	175,670
8	Hurlingham	(Buenos Aires Province)	Hurlingham	174,165
9	Berazategui	(Buenos Aires Province)	Berazategui	167,498
10	González Catán	(Buenos Aires Province)	La Matanza	163,815
11	San Miguel	(Buenos Aires Province)	San Miguel	157,532
12	Moreno	(Buenos Aires Province)	Moreno	148,290
13	San Fernando	(Buenos Aires Province)	San Fernando	145,165
14	Isidro Casanova	(Buenos Aires Province)	La Matanza	131,981
15	Bernal	(Buenos Aires Province)	Quilmes	130,790
16	Florencio Varela	(Buenos Aires Province)	Florencio Varela	120,678
17	Avellaneda	(Buenos Aires Province)	Avellaneda	112,980
18	Lomas de Zamora	(Buenos Aires Province)	Lomas de Zamora	111,897
19	Temperley	(Buenos Aires Province)	Lomas de Zamora	111,160
20	Monte Grande	(Buenos Aires Province)	Esteban Echeverría	109,644
21	San Justo	(Buenos Aires Province)	La Matanza	105,274
22	Ituzaingó	(Buenos Aires Province)	Ituzaingó	104,712
23	Castelar	(Buenos Aires Province)	Morón	104,019
24	Rafael Castillo	(Buenos Aires Province)	La Matanza	103,992
25	Libertad	(Buenos Aires Province)	Merlo	100,324
26	Ramos Mejía	(Buenos Aires Province)	La Matanza	97,076
27	Ezeiza	(Buenos Aires Province)	Ezeiza	93,246
28	Morón	(Buenos Aires Province)	Morón	92,725
29	Caseros	(Buenos Aires Province)	Tres de Febrero	90,313
30	Parque San Martín	(Buenos Aires Province)	Merlo	89,073
31	Burzaco	(Buenos Aires Province)	Almirante Brown	86,113
32	Grand Bourg	(Buenos Aires Province)	Malvinas Argentinas	85,189
33	Monte Chingolo	(Buenos Aires Province)	Lanús	85,060
34	San Francisco Solano	(Buenos Aires Province)	Quilmes; Almirante Brown	81,707
35	Remedios de Escalada	(Buenos Aires Province)	Lanús	81,465
36	La Tablada	(Buenos Aires Province)	La Matanza	80,389
37	Ciudad Madero	(Buenos Aires Province)	La Matanza	75,582
38	Olivos	(Buenos Aires Province)	Vicente López	75,527
39	El Palomar	(Buenos Aires Province)	Morón; Tres de Febrero	74,757
40	Boulogne Sur Mer	(Buenos Aires Province)	San Isidro	73,496
41	Ciudadela	(Buenos Aires Province)	Tres de Febrero	73,155
42	Ezpeleta	(Buenos Aires Province)	Quilmes	72,557
43	Ciudad Evita	(Buenos Aires Province)	La Matanza	68,650
44	Bella Vista	(Buenos Aires Province)	San Miguel	67,936
45	Wilde	(Buenos Aires Province)	Avellaneda	65,881
46	Martínez	(Buenos Aires Province)	San Isidro	65,859
47	Don Torcuato	(Buenos Aires Province)	Tigre	64,867
48	Gerli	(Buenos Aires Province)	Avellaneda; Lanús	64,640
49	Ciudad Jardín	(Buenos Aires Province)	Tres de Febrero	61,780
50	Sarandí	(Buenos Aires Province)	Avellaneda	60,752
51	Villa Tesei	(Buenos Aires Province)	Hurlingham	60,165
52	Florida	(Buenos Aires Province)	Vicente López	59,844
53	Villa Domínico	(Buenos Aires Province)	Avellaneda	58,824
54	Béccar	(Buenos Aires Province)	San Isidro	58,811
55	Glew	(Buenos Aires Province)	Almirante Brown	57,878
56	Rafael Calzada	(Buenos Aires Province)	Almirante Brown	56,419
57	Mariano Acosta	(Buenos Aires Province)	Merlo	54,081
58	Los Polvorines	(Buenos Aires Province)	Malvinas Argentinas	53,354
59	Lomas del Mirador	(Buenos Aires Province)	La Matanza	51,488
60	Villa Centenario	(Buenos Aires Province)	Lomas de Zamora	49,737
61	William Morris	(Buenos Aires Province)	Hurlingham	48,916
62	Longchamps	(Buenos Aires Province)	Almirante Brown	47,622
63	San Isidro	(Buenos Aires Province)	San Isidro	45,190
64	Villa Adelina	(Buenos Aires Province)	Vicente López	44,587
65	San José	(Buenos Aires Province)	Lomas de Zamora	44,437
66	Villa de Mayo	(Buenos Aires Province)	Malvinas Argentinas	43,405
67	General Pacheco	(Buenos Aires Province)	Tigre	43,287
68	Villa Fiorito	(Buenos Aires Province)	Lomas de Zamora	42,904
69	Paso del Rey	(Buenos Aires Province)	Moreno	41,775
70	Llavallol	(Buenos Aires Province)	Lomas de Zamora	41,463
71	Tortuguitas	(Buenos Aires Province)	Malvinas Argentinas; José C. Paz	41,310
72	Claypole	(Buenos Aires Province)	Almirante Brown	41,176
73	Valentín Alsina	(Buenos Aires Province)	Lanús	41,155
74	Virreyes	(Buenos Aires Province)	San Fernando	39,507
75	Victoria	(Buenos Aires Province)	San Fernando	39,447
76	Pablo Nogués	(Buenos Aires Province)	Malvinas Argentinas	38,470
77	Haedo	(Buenos Aires Province)	Morón	38,068
78	San Antonio de Padua	(Buenos Aires Province)	Merlo	37,775
79	Munro	(Buenos Aires Province)	Vicente López	35,844
80	Villa Ballester	(Buenos Aires Province)	San Martín	35,301
81	Pontevedra	(Buenos Aires Province)	Merlo	33,515
82	Villa Udaondo	(Buenos Aires Province)	Ituzaingó	31,490
83	Villa La Florida	(Buenos Aires Province)	Quilmes	31,268
84	Tigre	(Buenos Aires Province)	Tigre	31,106
85	San Martín	(Buenos Aires Province)	San Martín	28,339
86	Adrogué	(Buenos Aires Province)	Almirante Brown	28,265
87	Tristán Suárez	(Buenos Aires Province)	Ezeiza	27,746
88	Muñiz	(Buenos Aires Province)	San Miguel	26,221
89	Villa Martelli	(Buenos Aires Province)	Vicente López	26,059
90	Villa Bosch	(Buenos Aires Province)	Tres de Febrero	24,702
91	Villa Maipú	(Buenos Aires Province)	San Martín	24,447
92	Vicente López	(Buenos Aires Province)	Vicente López	24,078
93	Don Bosco	(Buenos Aires Province)	Quilmes	20,876
94	Billinghurst	(Buenos Aires Province)	San Martín	19,138
95	Martín Coronado	(Buenos Aires Province)	Tres de Febrero	19,121
96	Villa Sarmiento	(Buenos Aires Province)	Morón	17,737
97	Ranelagh	(Buenos Aires Province)	Berazategui	15,262
98	Tapiales	(Buenos Aires Province)	La Matanza	15,148
99	Aldo Bonzi	(Buenos Aires Province)	La Matanza	13,410

== Gallery ==
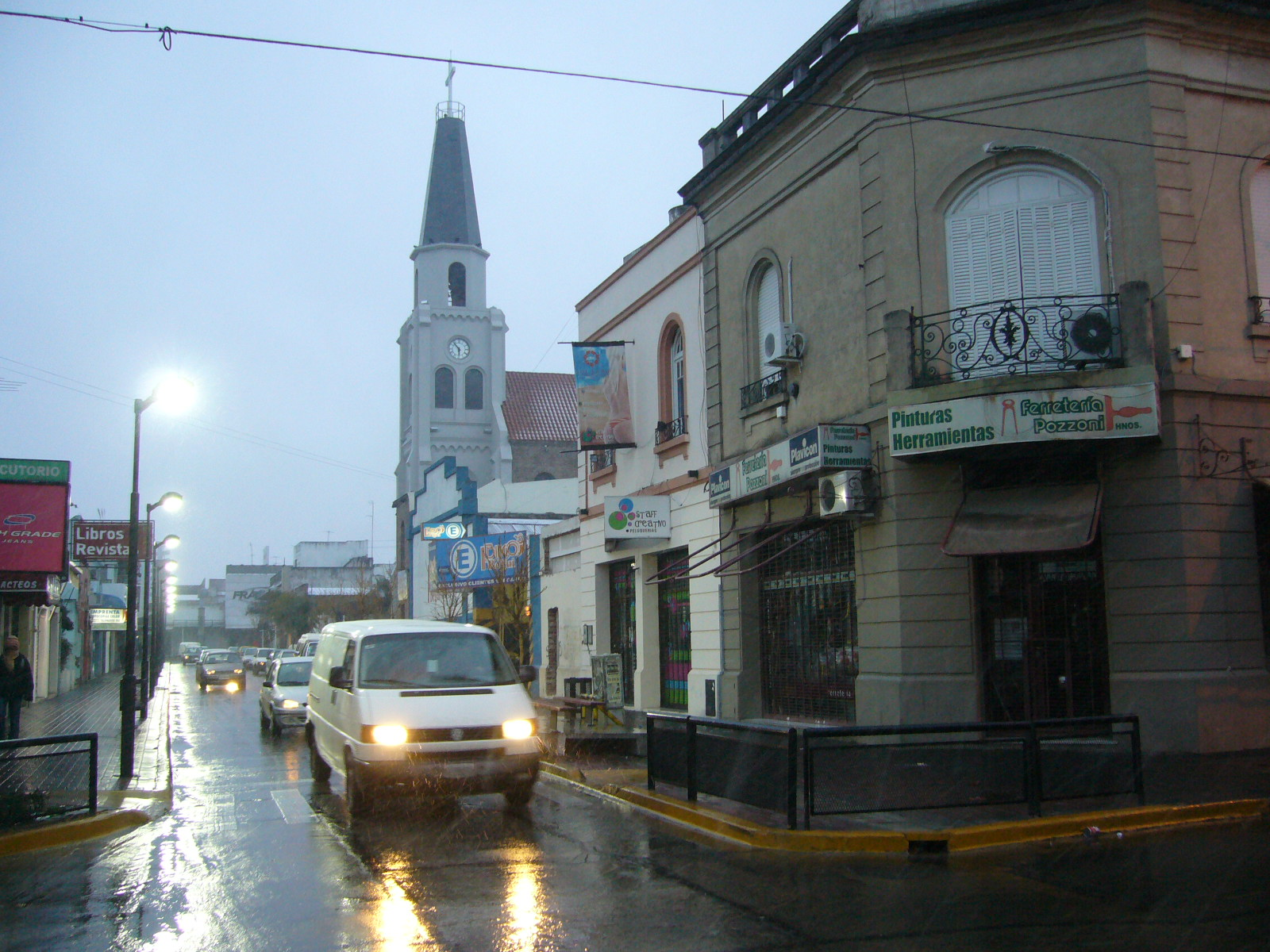
Berazategui

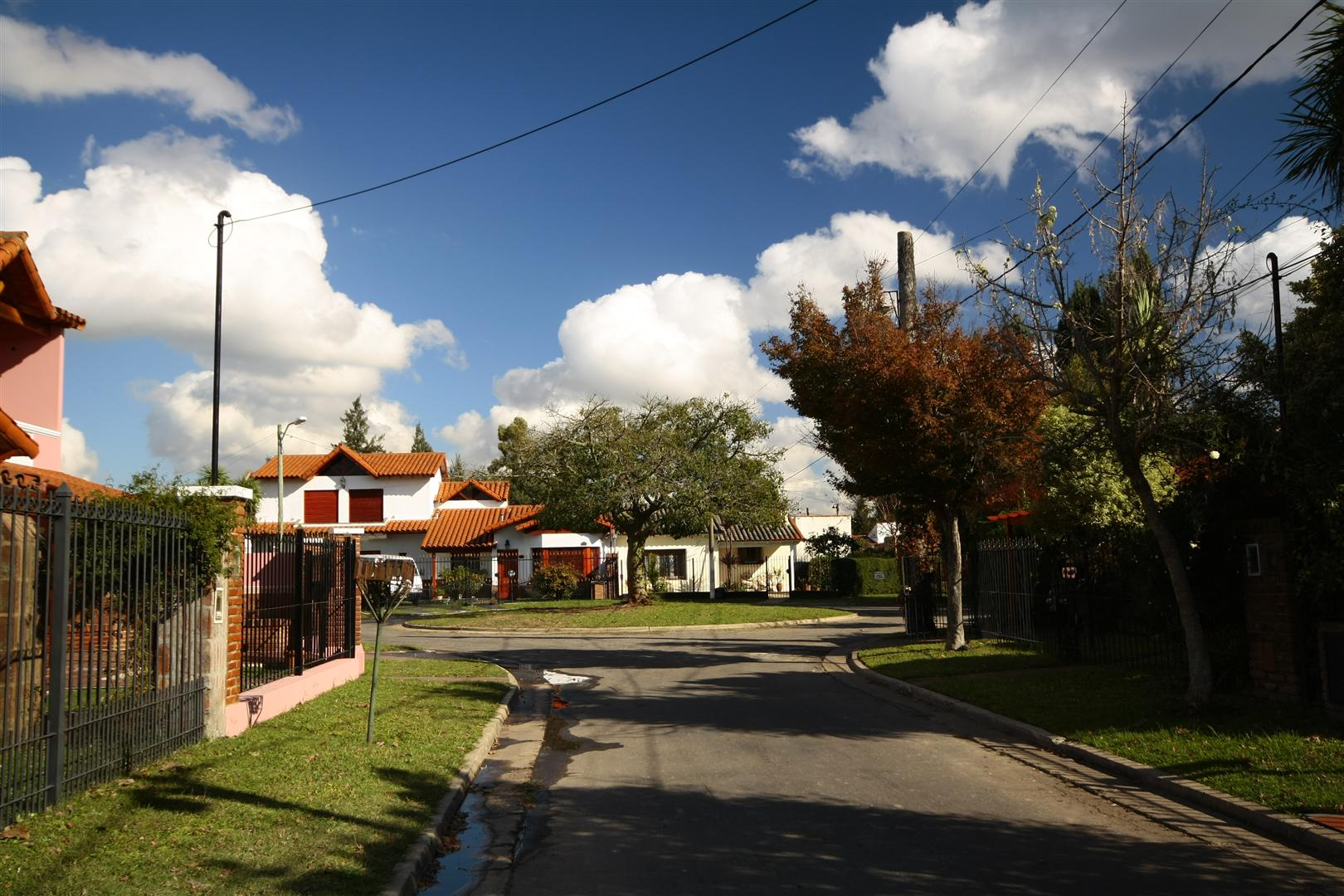
Ciudad Evita (La Matanza Partido)

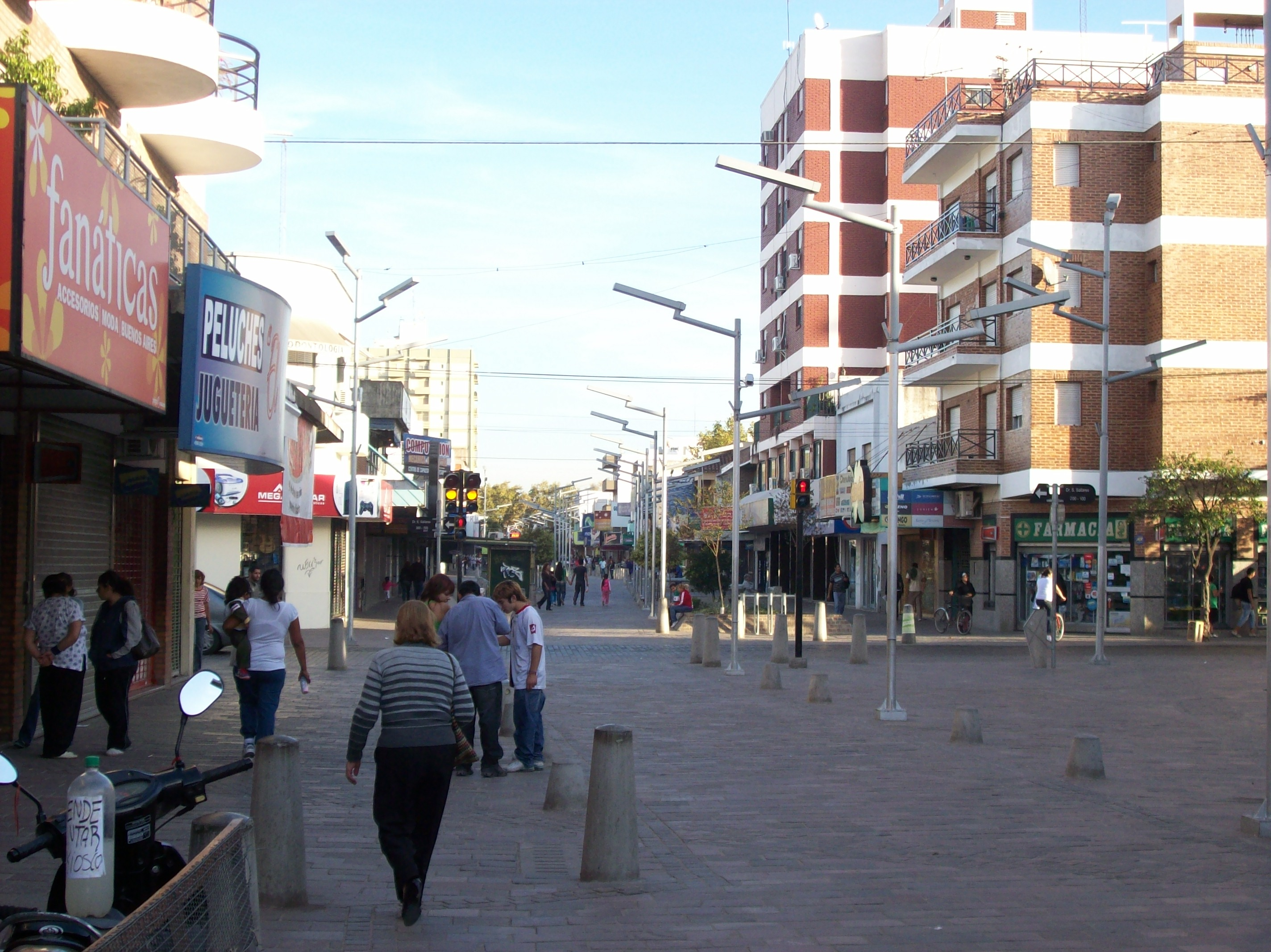
Florencio Varela

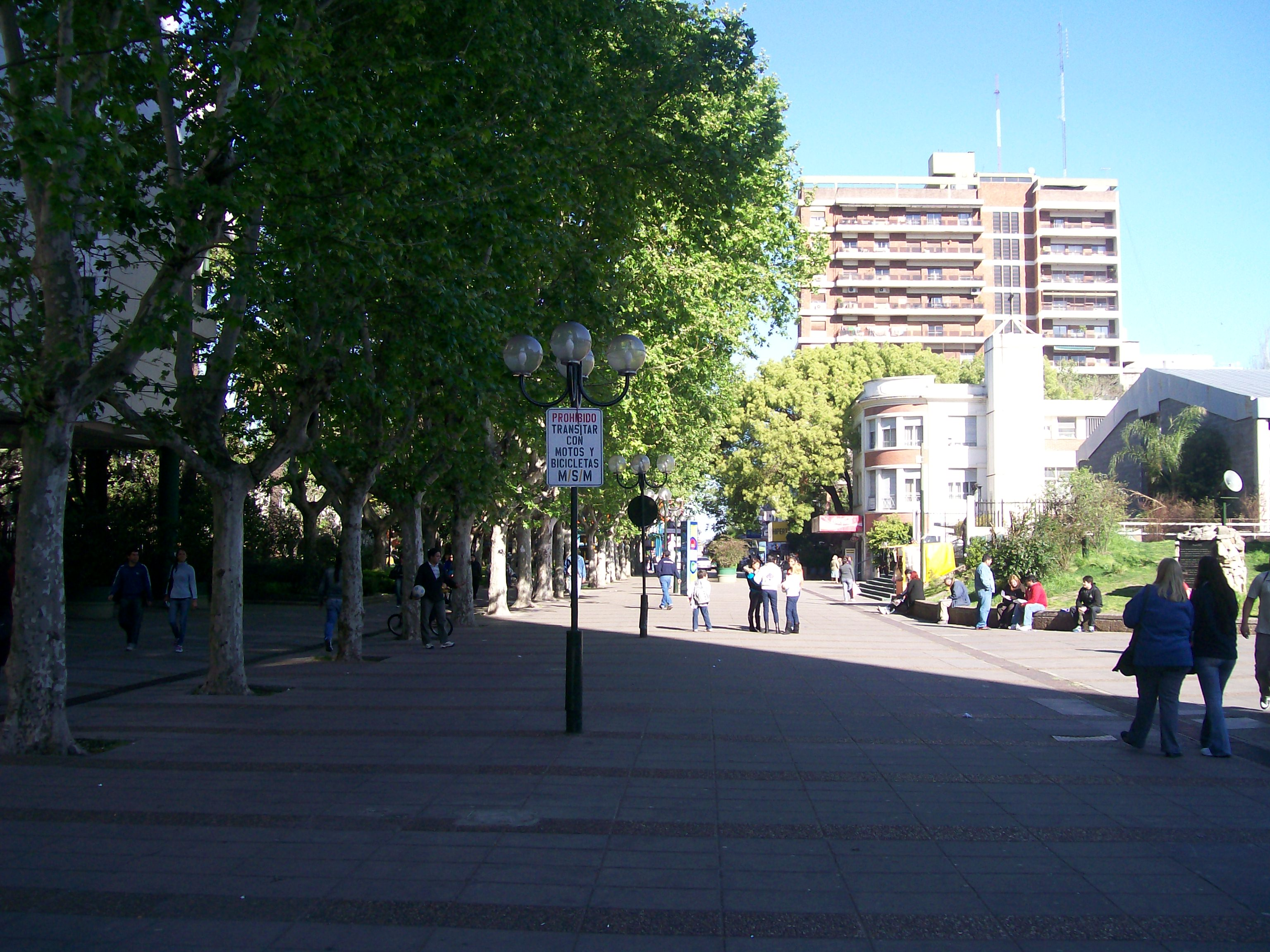
General San Martín

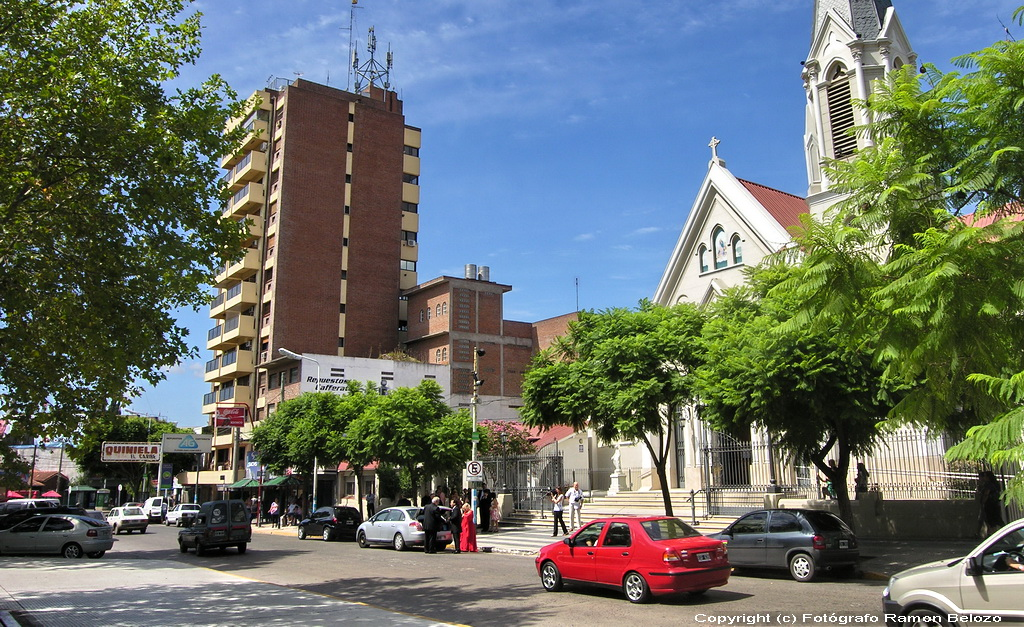
Monte Grande (Esteban Echeverría Partido)

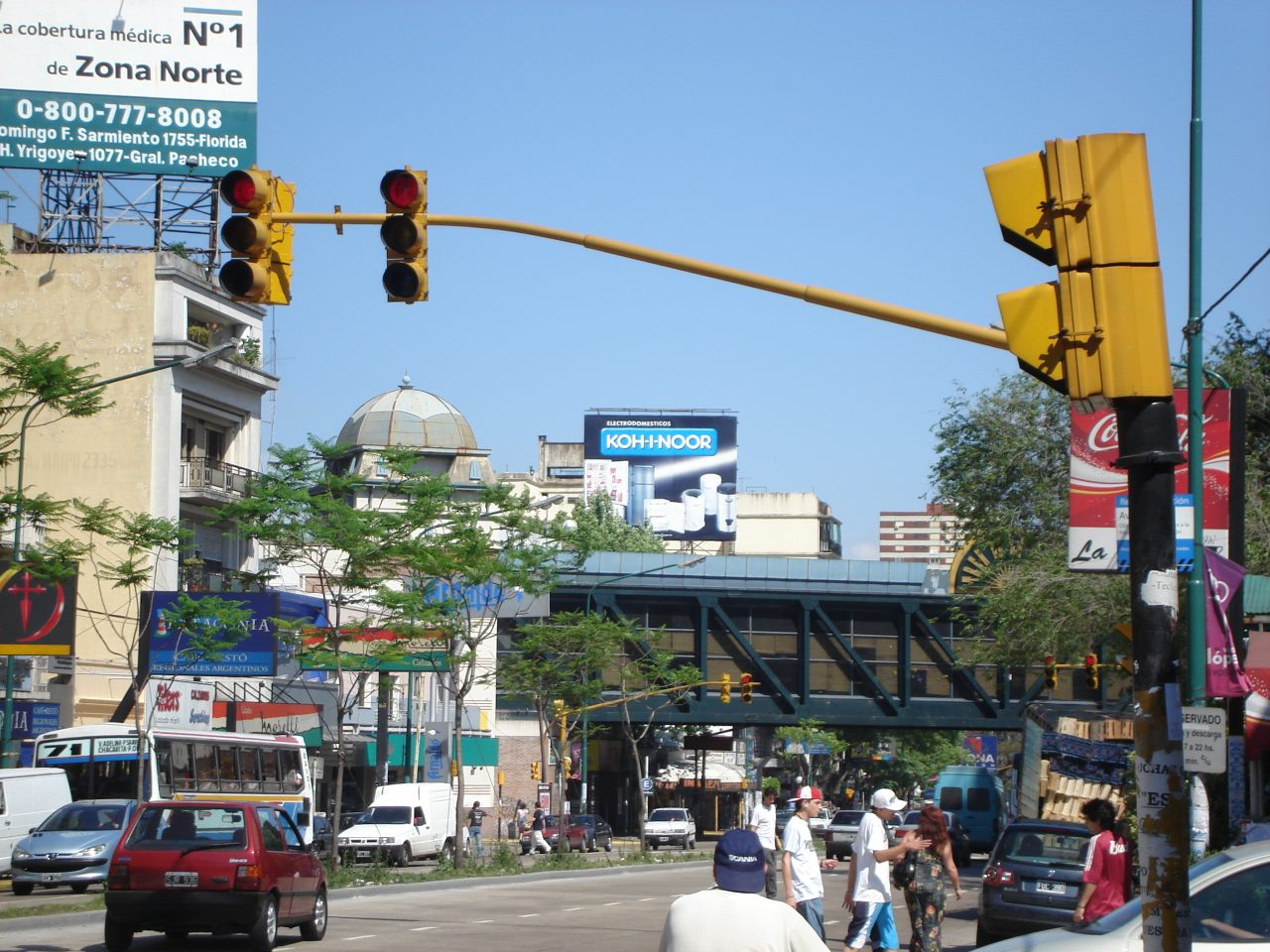
Olivos (Vicente López Partido)

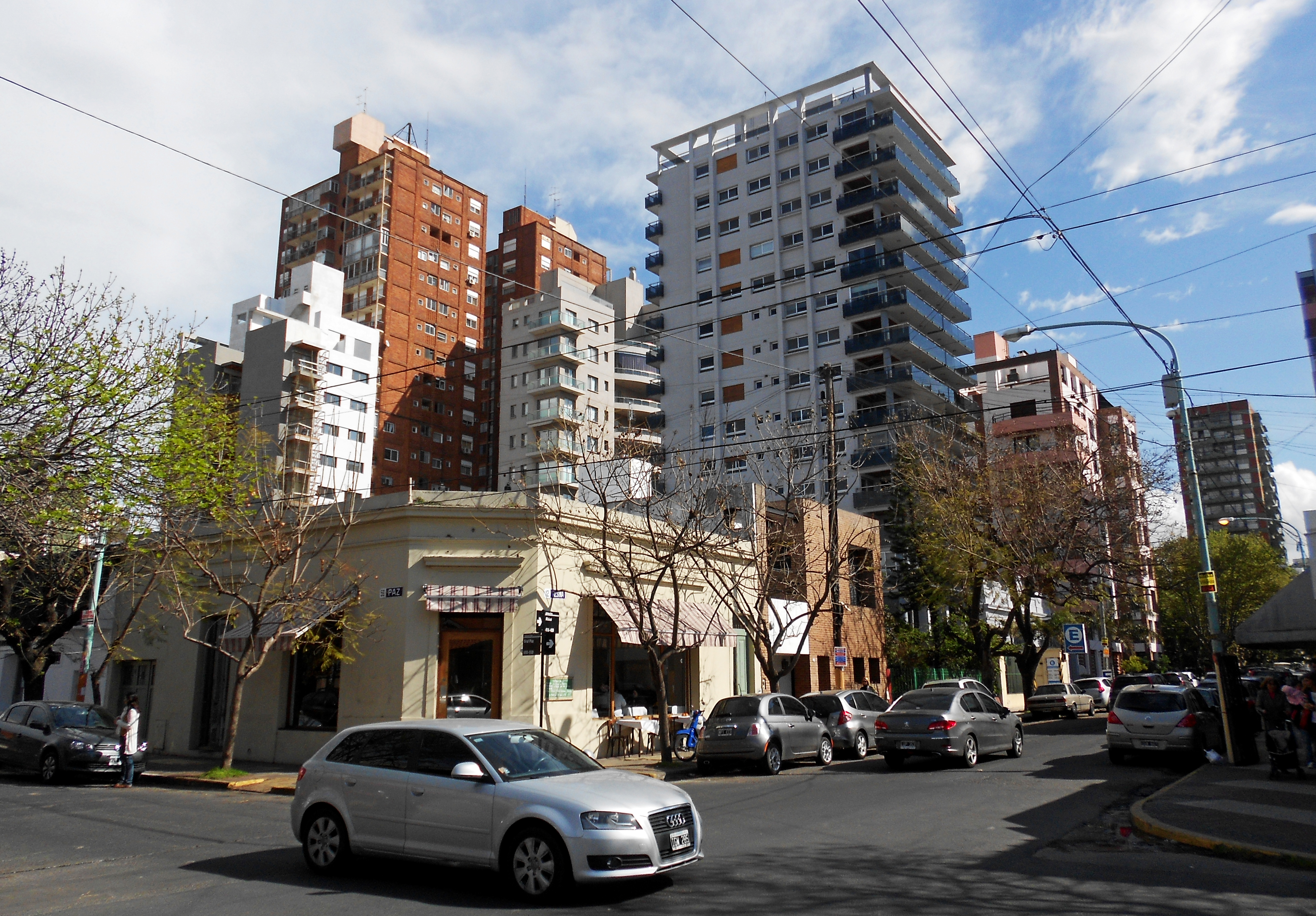
Quilmes

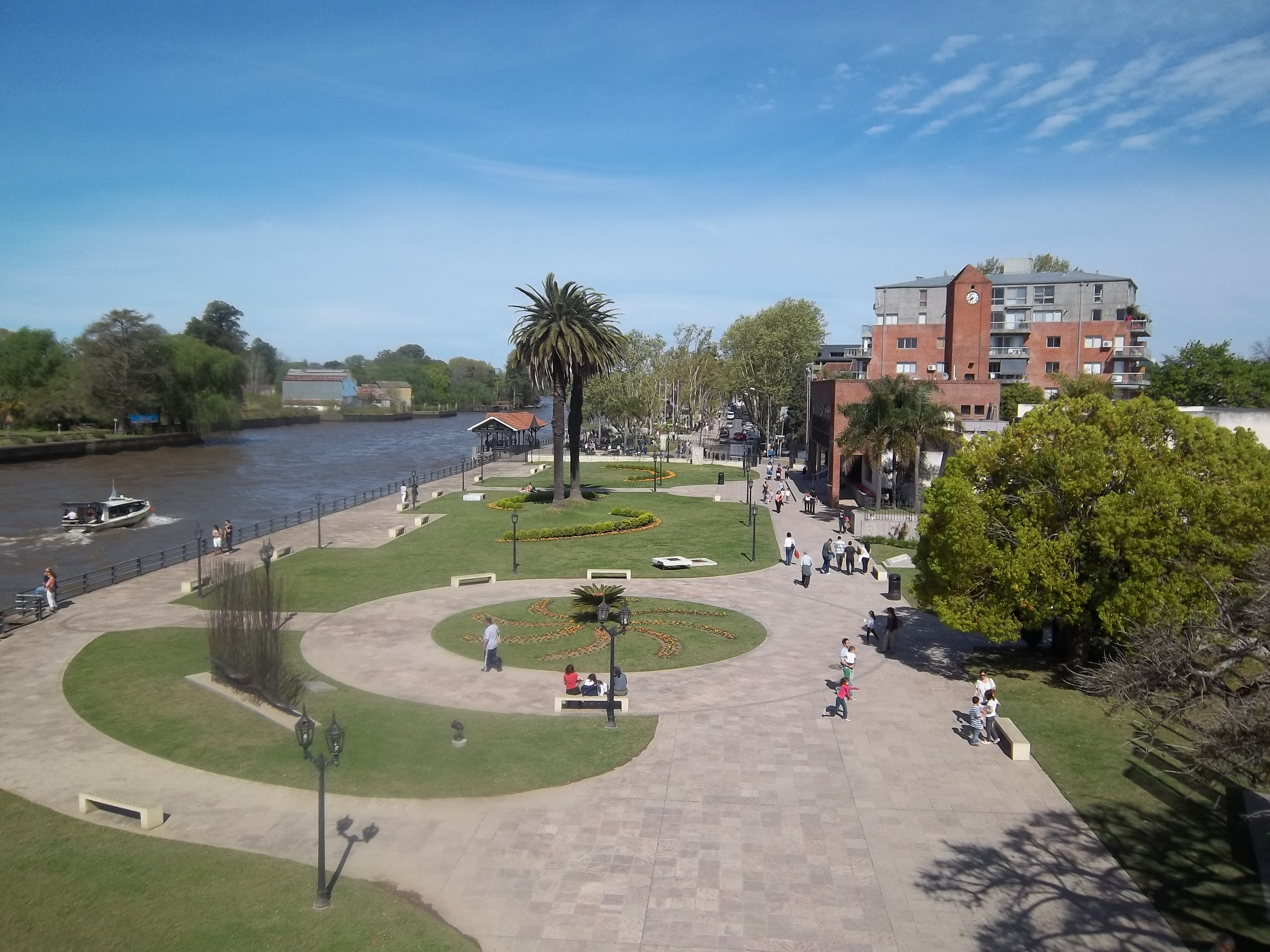
Tigre

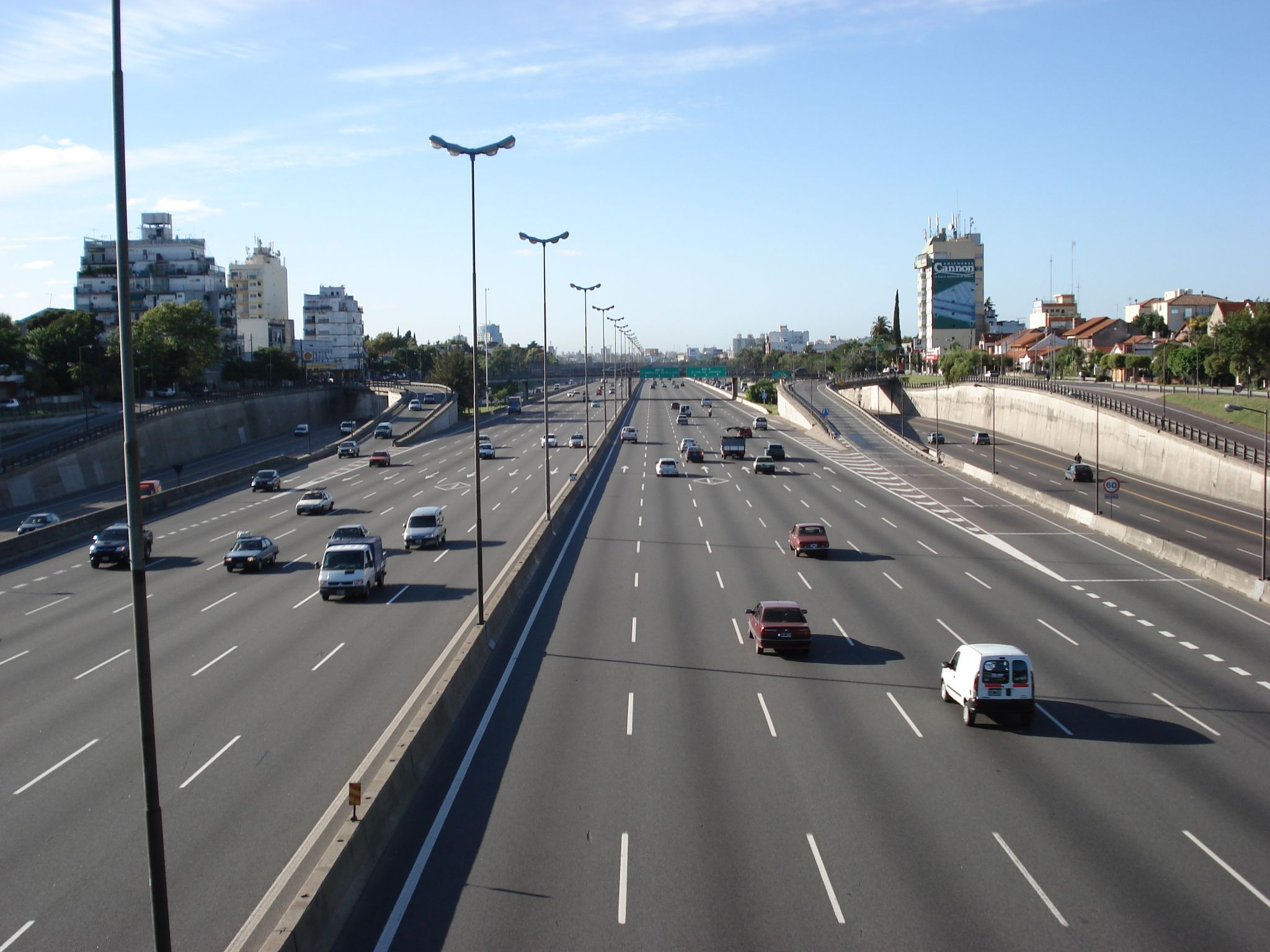
Pan-American Expressway, north of Buenos Aires
