= Don Bosco, Buenos Aires =

Don Bosco
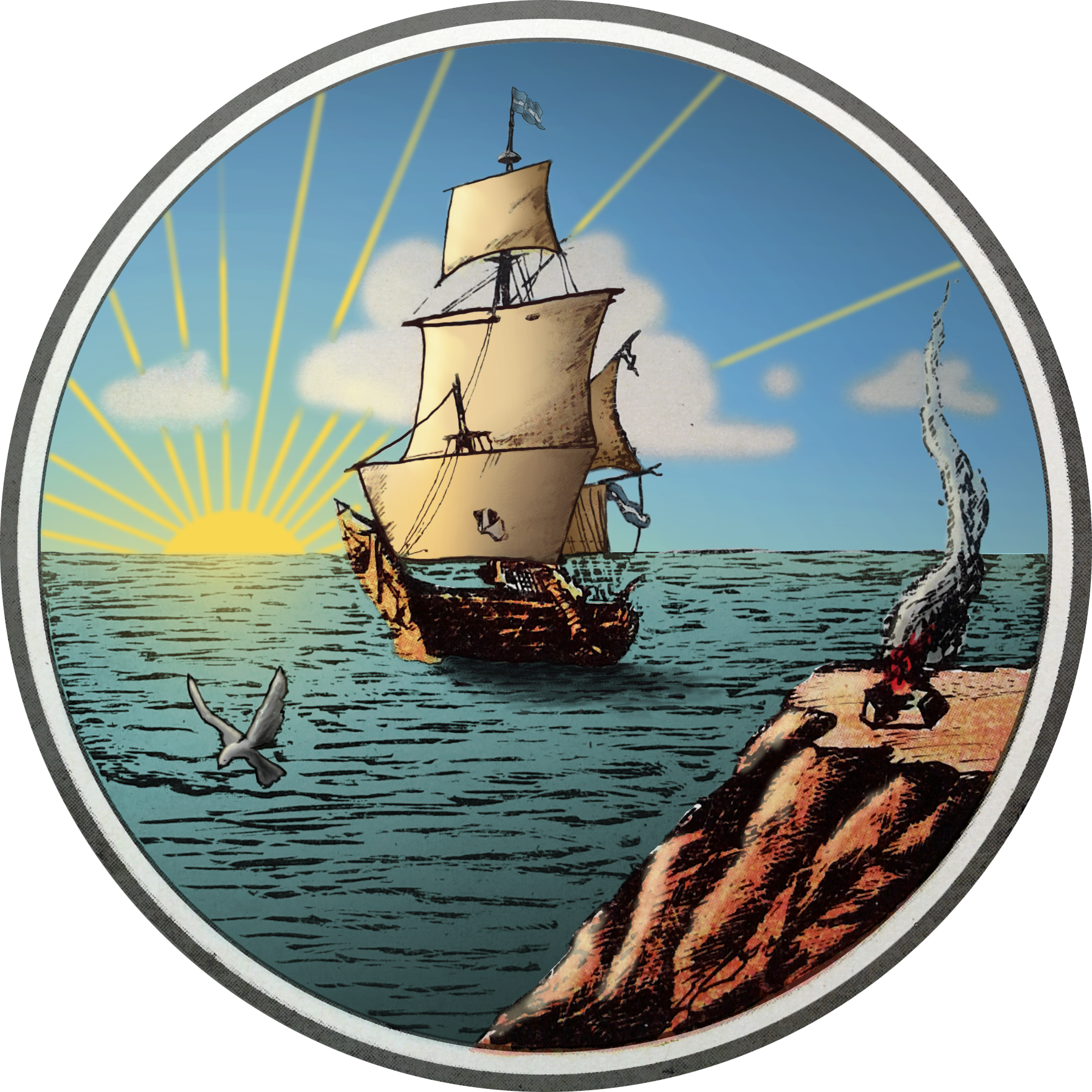
- Seal

- Location in Greater Buenos Aires
- Coordinates: 34°42′0″S 58°17′0″W
- Country: Argentina
- Province: Buenos Aires Province
- Partido: Quilmes

Government
  - Mayor: Mayra Mendoza (Union for the Homeland)
- Elevation: 11 m (36 ft)

Population (2001)
  - Total: 20,876
- Time zone: UTC-3 (P)
  - Summer (DST): UTC-2 (O)
- Código Postal (CP): B1876
- Website: www.quilmes.gov.ar
- Location in the Greater Buenos Aires

Don Bosco is a locality and rail station in the north-eastern section of the Quilmes Partido (south of the Greater Buenos Aires, Argentina). Formerly called "Station of the 13th kilometer", it takes its name from the Salesians of Don Bosco and the Salesian Sisters of Don Bosco congregations located in Bernal; the same neighbors sought the name change, which was issued on 4 November 1929. The demonym for residents is bosquenses.

Don Bosco stands surrounding the Railway General Roca. His station is the sixth from Constitution Station.

It is a mostly residential neighborhood, with a small commercial center near the station.

== Population ==
Don Bosco has 20,876 inhabitants according to the last census. It is the locality with the fewest people in the Quilmes Partido, representing 4% of its population.

== Gallery ==
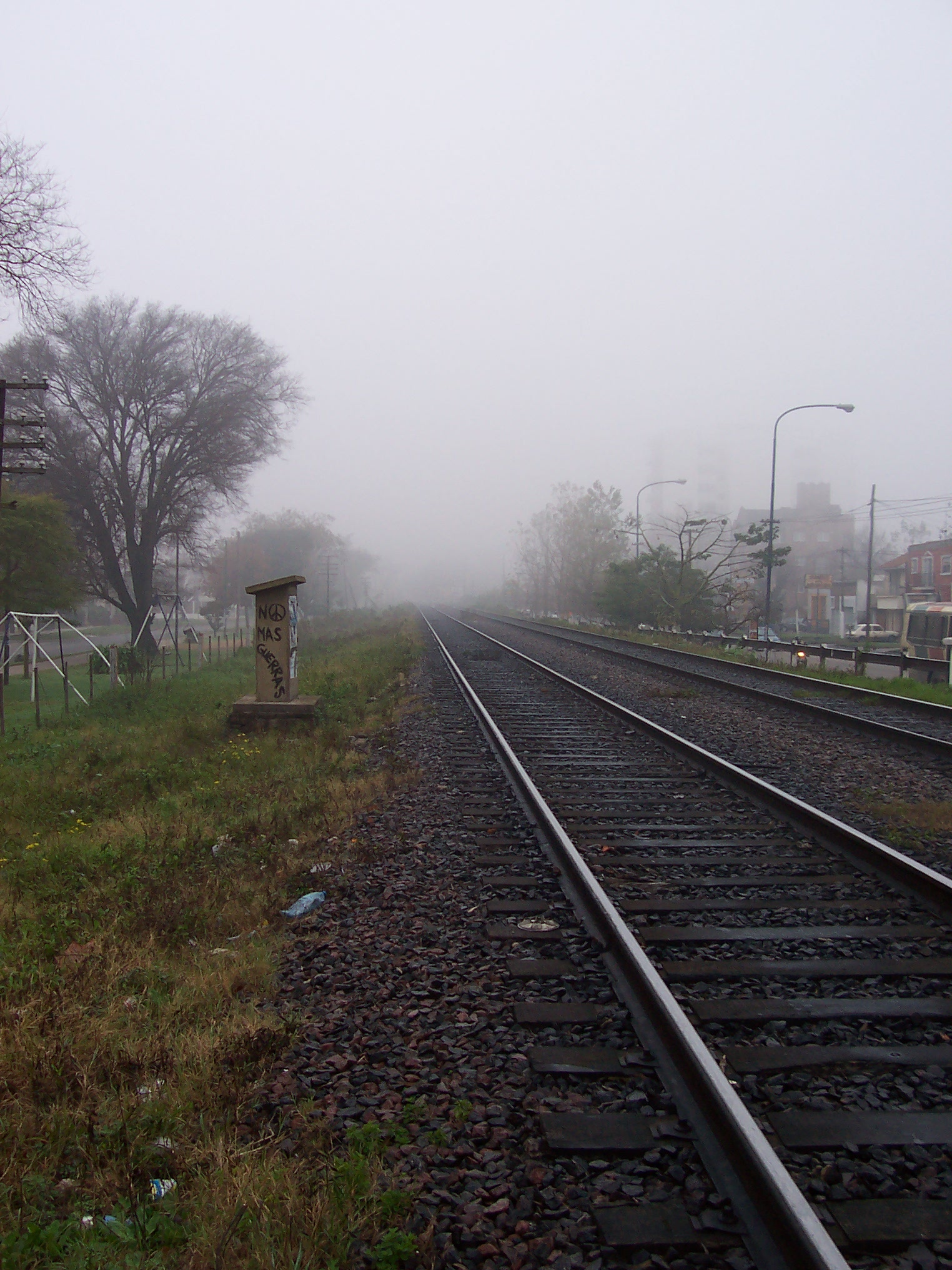
The rail lines of the Railway General Roca, photographed during a clouding morning.

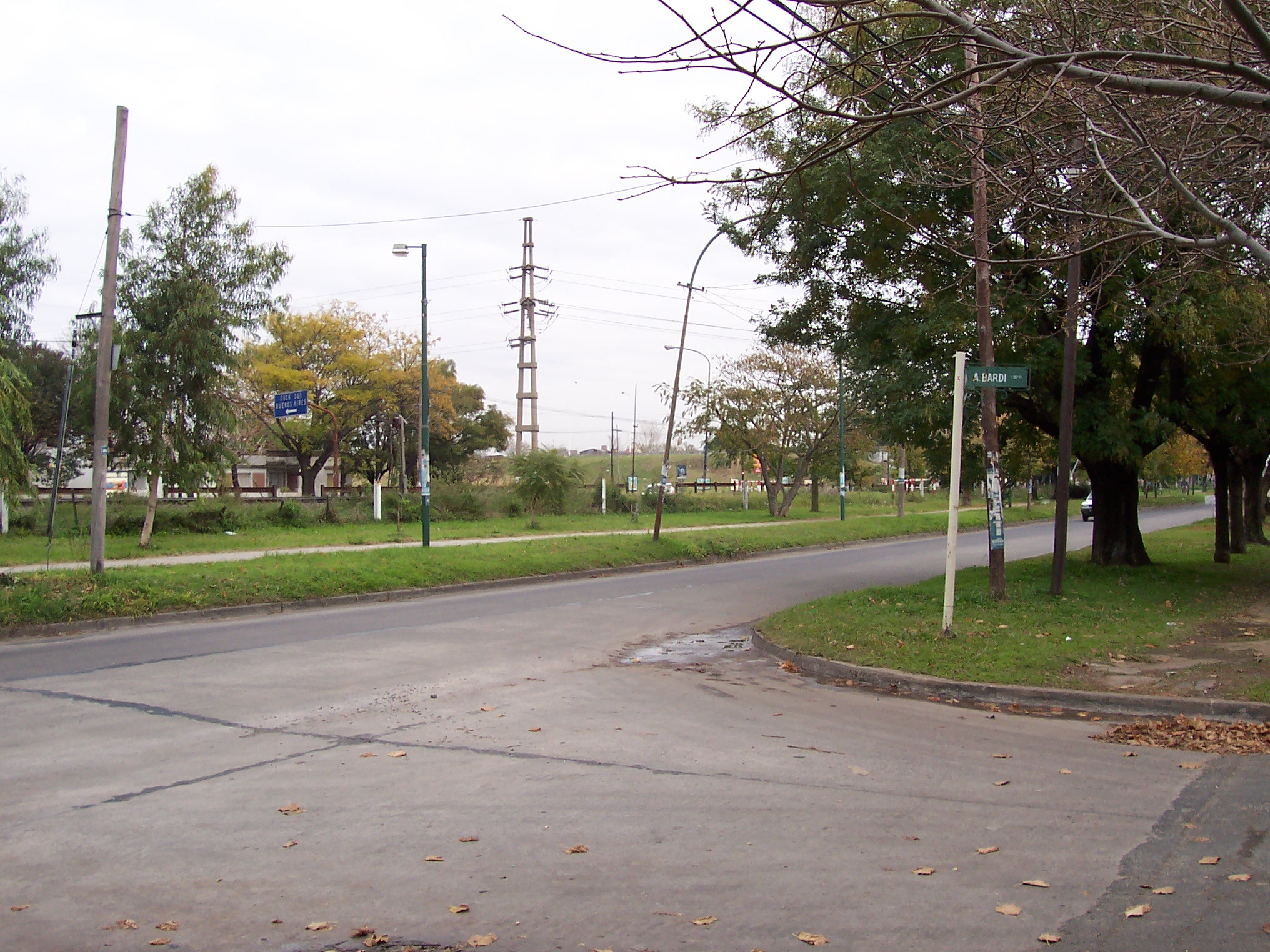
View to a street, parallel to the railway.
