= San Francisco Solano =

- City
- Location in Greater Buenos Aires
- Coordinates: 34°46′S 58°19′W
- Country: Argentina
- Province: Buenos Aires
- Partido: Quilmes and Almirante Brown
- Founded: 1949
- Elevation: 12 m (39 ft)

Population (2001 census [INDEC])
  - Total: 81,707
- CPA Base: B 1846 & B 1881
- Area code: +54 11

San Francisco Solano, usually known as Solano, is a city in Buenos Aires Province, Argentina. It forms part of the Greater Buenos Aires agglomeration. It is divided between the Quilmes and Almirante Brown partidos.

== History ==
- 17 February 1173, the Franciscan convent of Buenos Aires buys territory in the area but sells it in 1871
- 1948, the territory is subdivided into plots and sold by the provincial administration
- 1949, the settlement is officially founded with the name of San Francisco Solano, despite a council resolution to name the settlement after Paulino Barreiro, a Buenos Aires-born judge assassinated in 1840
- 12 October 1981, the settlement is officially declared a city

== Name ==
The city is named after Spanish missionary St. Francisco Solano (10 March 1549 – 14 July 1610).

== Population ==
There are 53,363 inhabitants who live in the Quilmes-administered part of the city and 28,344 inhabitants in Almirante Brown partido.
