= Ituzaingó Partido =

Ituzaingó Partido de Ituzaingó
- Department
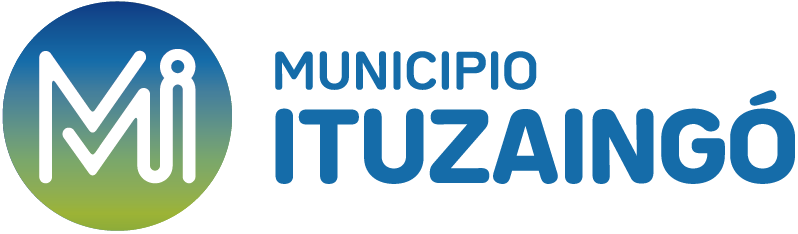

- location of in Buenos Aires Province
- Coordinates: 34°39′08″S 58°40′30″W
- Country: Argentina
- Established: May 14, 1995
- Founder: provincial law 11610
- Seat: Ituzaingó

Government
  - Intendant: Pablo Descalzo (PJ)

Area
  - Total: 38.51 km^{2} (14.87 sq mi)

Population
  - Total: 180,232
  - Density: 4,680/km^{2} (12,120/sq mi)
- Demonym: ituzainguense
- Postal Code: B1714
- IFAM: BUE061
- Area Code: 011
- Website: www.miituzaingo.gov.ar

Ituzaingó is a partido of Buenos Aires Province. It is in the Gran Buenos Aires urban area, Argentina, 10 kilometres (6.2 mi) west of Buenos Aires city. It has an area of 38.51 km^{2} (14.9 sq mi) and a population of 180,232 (2022 census [INDEC]). Its capital, the city of Ituzaingó, and the other districts in Ituzaingó Partido were part of the Morón Partido until 1995.

== History ==
The partido of ltuzaingó stems from the Provincial Law No. 11,610 enacted on December 28, 1994, when Eduardo Duhalde was governor of the Province of Buenos Aires. It allowed the creation of the partidos of Hurlingham Partido and ltuzaingó from the division of the former partido of Morón Partido.

During the elections of May 14, 1995 came the first elected officials of ltuzaingó Partido for 1995-1999: Alberto Daniel Descalzo was elected mayor and took office on December 11 that year at a ceremony in the hall acts of the School No. 1. At the same time, the City Council was constituted by Horacio Ramiro González (First City Council president), Marcelo Nadal, Adalberto Montes de Oca, Luis Sosa, and Jose Gonzalez composing Justicialist Party bloc. Ricardo Vallarino, Ruben Rosso, and Alberto Fusco composing electoral coalition Frepaso-Pais bloc, and Yolanda Jaimez and Fernando Miño composing the Radical Civic Union bloc.

Currently, the mayor (Descalzo Jr.) and his family are under investigation for corruption. The investigation concerns the access to power and public office for his entire family.

== Insecurity - Crimes ==
The homicide rate has historically averaged around 5 cases per 100,000 inhabitants, while urban robbery rates have peaked at over 1,100 cases per 100,000 inhabitants.

== Settlements ==
- Ituzaingó
- Villa Udaondo

=== Districts ===
  - Parque Leloir
  - El Pilar
  - Villa Ariza
  - San Alberto

== Sport ==
Ituzaingó Partido is home to Club Atlético Ituzaingó, a football club who play in the regionalised 4th Division.
