= Villa Tesei =

- Town
- Location in Greater Buenos Aires
- Coordinates: 34°36′S 58°37′W
- Country: Argentina
- Province: Buenos Aires
- Partido: Hurlingham
- Elevation: 15 m (49 ft)

Population (2001 census [INDEC])
  - Total: 60,165
- CPA Base: B 1688
- Area code: +54 11

Villa Tesei is a town in Buenos Aires Province, Argentina. It is located in the Greater Buenos Aires agglomeration, in the Hurlingham Partido.

== History ==
Before the foundation of Hurlingham Partido in 1994 Villa Tesei was part of Morón Partido.
