= William C. Morris, Buenos Aires =

William C. Morris
- Town
- Location in Greater Buenos Aires
- Coordinates: 34°36′S 58°37′W
- Country: Argentina
- Province: Buenos Aires
- Partido: Hurlingham
- Elevation: 15 m (49 ft)

Population (2001 census [INDEC])
  - Total: 48,916
- CPA Base: B 1688
- Area code: +54 11

Intersection of General Conrado Villegas and General Pedro Díaz streets in William C. Morris, Buenos Aires Province, Argentina.

William C. Morris is a town in Buenos Aires Province, Argentina. It forms part of the Greater Buenos Aires metropolitan area and is located in the Hurlingham Partido.

== Name ==
The town is named to honor Englishman William Case Morris (16 February 1864 – 15 September 1932), Methodist, educator and founder of the first Methodist Chapel in Argentina. He arrived in Argentina as a ten-year-old youth with his widowed father, and eventually founded a series of children's shelters in Buenos Aires. He returned to England shortly before his death.
