= Villa La Florida =

- Location in Greater Buenos Aires
- Coordinates: 34°43′S 58°17′W
- Country: Argentina
- Province: Buenos Aires
- Partido: Quilmes
- Founded: 1926
- Elevation: 16 m (52 ft)

Population (2001 census [INDEC])
  - Total: 31,268
- CPA Base: B 1881
- Area code: +54 11

Villa La Florida is a town in Buenos Aires Province, Argentina. It is located in the Quilmes Partido in the south of the Greater Buenos Aires agglomeration.

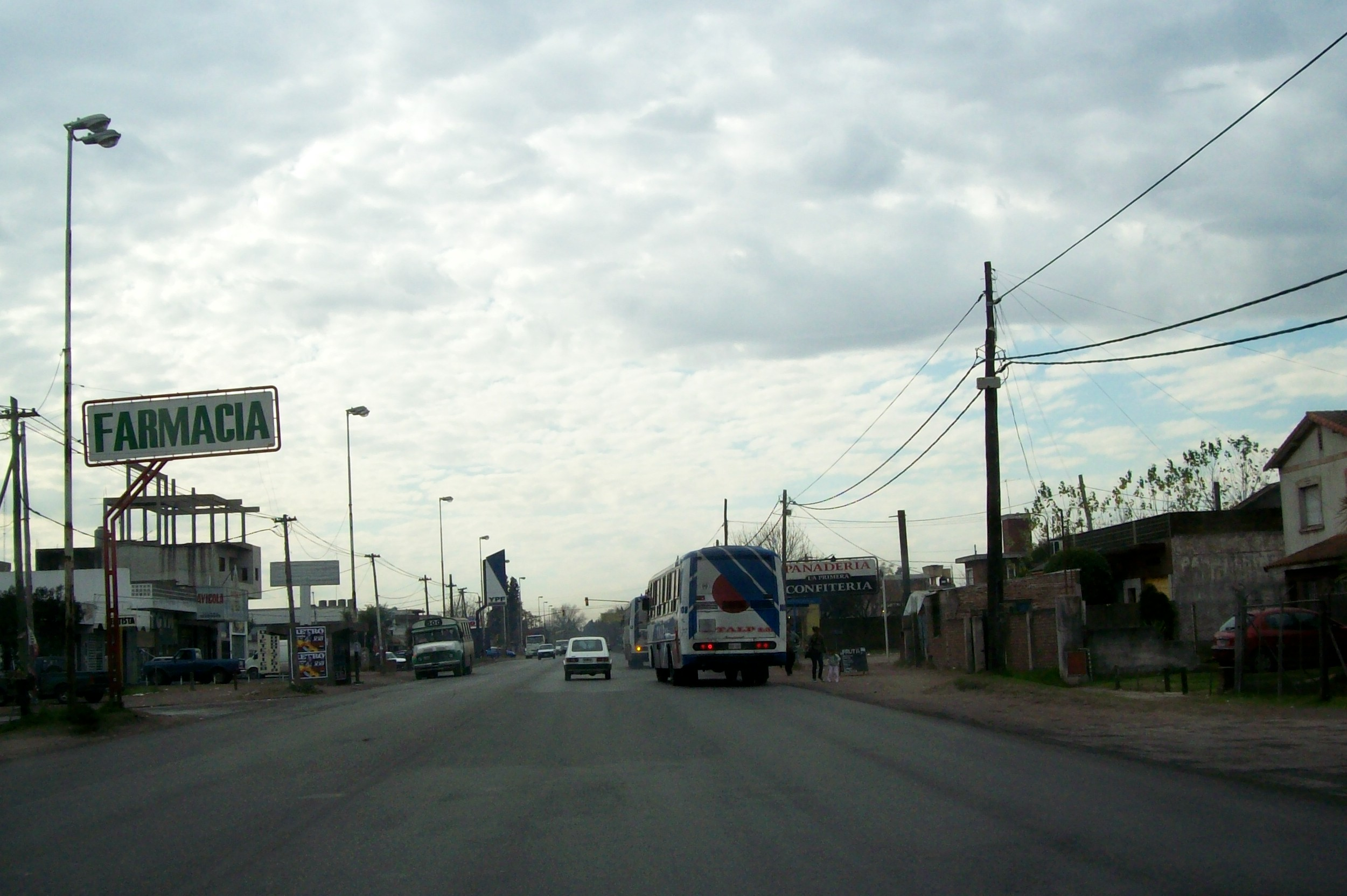
Gobernador Monteverde Avenue (Provincial Route 4)
