= Rivers of Life =

Global distribution of Rivers of Life churches by nation

International Rivers of Life logo

Rivers of Life (Spanish: Ríos de Vida) is a group of approximately eighty evangelical churches around the world. The churches are in countries including the United Kingdom, Spain, France, Netherlands, Argentina, Paraguay, Chile, Bolivia, Colombia, El Salvador, Cuba, Panama and the United States.

Rivers of Life has 4 bible colleges known as Bible Houses, 2 children's homes, a school with approximately 600 students, and an FM radio station (FM Victoria) amongst other ministries set up to serve the church's purposes.

It is not to be confused with other churches and organisations around the world called Rivers of Life. These include River of Life International, which was founded in the UK in 1995 and now has churches, schools and orphanages in Africa and India.

== History ==
Rivers of Life was founded in 1967 in Quilmes, a suburb of Buenos Aires, Argentina by the Spanish nationals Jorge Pradas and Oscar Mirón along with others. Mirón had moved to Argentina to flee the persecution of evangelical Christians in Spain under Francisco Franco. He fled the country after he had been a target in an attempted assassination. When the church began, he opened up his workshop for church meetings to be held there. Jorge Pradas was the main leader of the church at the time.

The church in Quilmes now has approximately 1,000 members. By the 1970s, churches had been established in Europe.

For Rivers of Life's 40th anniversary, the mayor of Quilmes, Sergio Villordo visited the first church.

== Beliefs ==
Rivers of Life holds to the orthodox Christian faith. It is a free, evangelical and charismatic Church.

Its practices include baptism, the Lord's Supper, the spiritual gifts and the New Testament vision of Christ's church.

It believes in the Father, Son and Holy Spirit and in the full divinity, atoning death and bodily resurrection of Christ. It also believes that the Bible is God's authoritative word inspired by the Holy Spirit.

Rivers of Life accepts and adheres to key tenets of the Christian faith, including the Apostles' Creed, the Athanasian Creed and the Nicene Creed.

== Bible Houses ==
Bible House in Quilmes, Buenos Aires, Argentina

Rivers of Life believe that as well as secular preparation for life, e.g., a university degree, Christians need to be prepared in other ways such as service, living in community and studying the Bible. For this reason, it formed bible colleges known as Bible Houses. Their name derives from the fact that nearly all the students live in the same hall of residence. The standard course lasts for two years.

There are currently four Bible Houses:

Location	Country	Founded	Current Head	Number of Students
Quilmes (Buenos Aires)	(Argentina)	1970^{†}	Alberto Hevia	50
Santa Fe	(Argentina)	1970^{†}	Jorge Leiva	30^{*}
Reus	(Spain)	2000^{†}	Maximiliano Delle Chiaie	15^{*}
Mar del Plata	(Argentina)	2007	Diego Di Sabatto	10
^{*}Estimate^{†}Approximate date

In Oxford, UK, there are two community houses but no Bible House.

All the Bible Houses are situated closed to a Rivers of Life church and the students attend all the church services. The Bible House students also serve the church in various ways.

Rivers of Life, Quilmes, Buenos Aires, Argentina

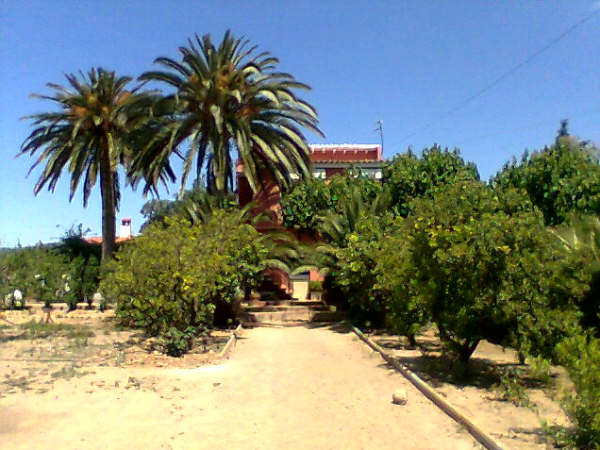
Bible House, Reus, Tarragona, Spain
