= Quilmes =

City in Buenos Aires Province, Argentina

- City
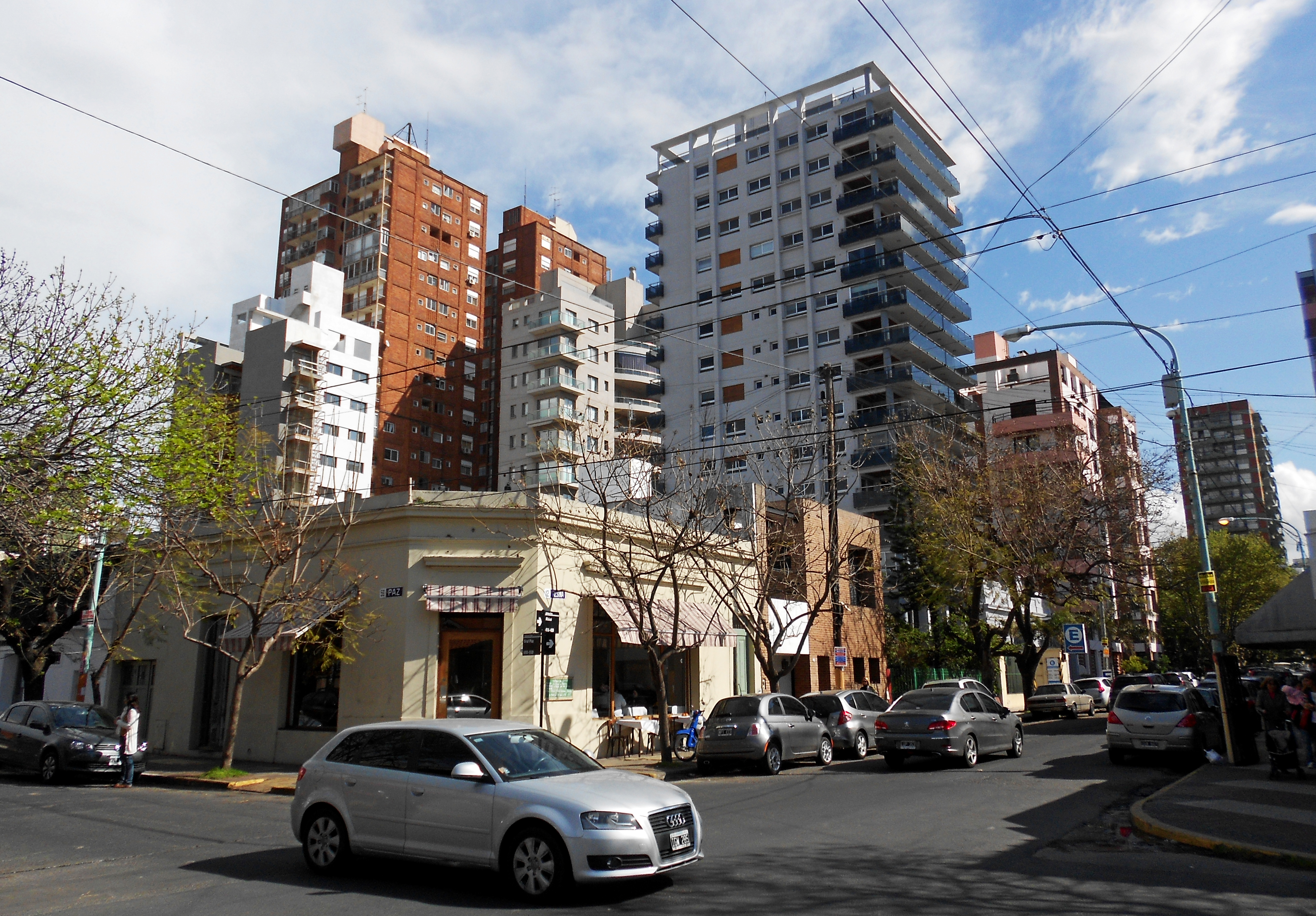

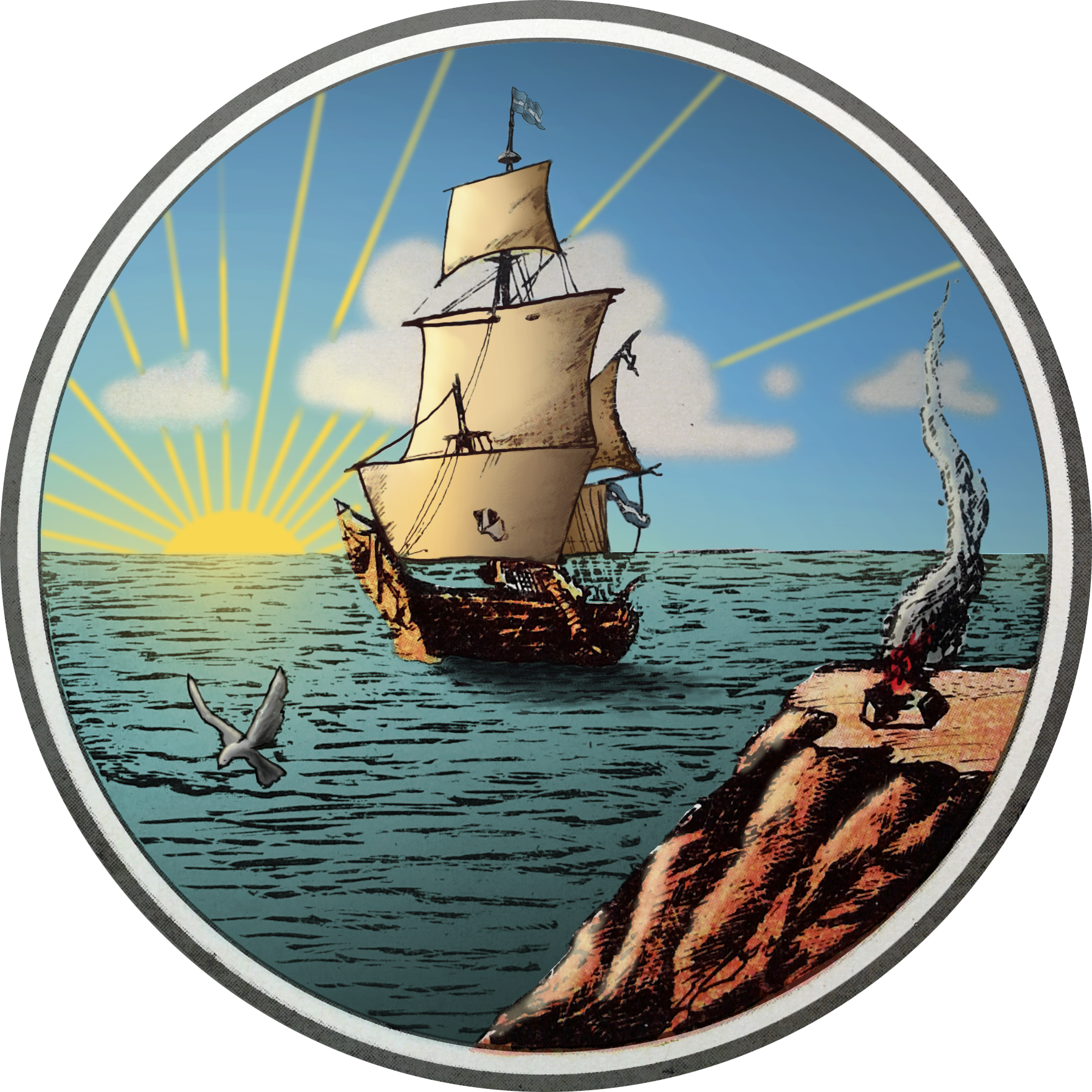
- Coat of arms

- Location in Greater Buenos Aires
- Coordinates: 34°43′00″S 58°16′00″W
- Country: Argentina
- Province: Buenos Aires Province
- Partido: Quilmes
- Founded: 1666
- Declared city: 1916

Government
  - Intendant: Mayra Mendoza (Union for the Homeland)
- Elevation: 17 m (56 ft)
- Time zone: UTC−3 (ART)
- CPA Base: B 1878, B 1879
- Area code: +54 11
- Website: www.quilmes.gov.ar

Quilmes (Spanish pronunciation: [ˈkilmes]) is a city on the coast of the Rio de la Plata, in the province of Buenos Aires, Argentina, on the southeast end of the Greater Buenos Aires, being some 17 km (11 mi) away from the urban centre area of Buenos Aires. The city was founded in 1666 and is the seat of the eponymous partido (district).

== History ==
The Quilmes were a native tribe who lived in the surroundings of Tucumán. In the 17th century, after repeated attempts by the Spanish invaders to control their lands, the Quilmes were defeated and were forced to settle in a restricted colony (reducción) near Buenos Aires, where the authorities could control them. The settlement was thus established in 1666 as Exaltación de la Santa Cruz de los Kilme. The 1,000 km (621 mi) journey from Tucumán was made on foot, causing hundreds of Quilmes to die in the process. The colony had been abandoned by 1810 and had become a ghost town. The land was divided in parcels and the town of Quilmes was established in 1818, which would later flourish during the wave of immigration in late 19th-century Argentina.

During the first British invasion, lasting 46 days in 1806, the British arrived from Montevideo through Quilmes and went to Buenos Aires from there before being defeated and expelled.

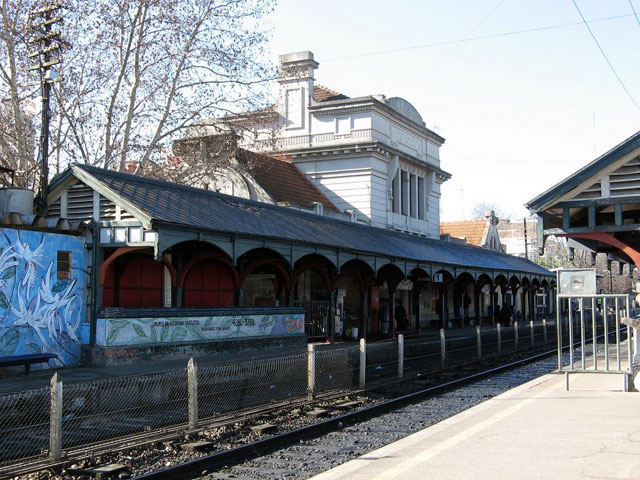
Quilmes Railroad Station

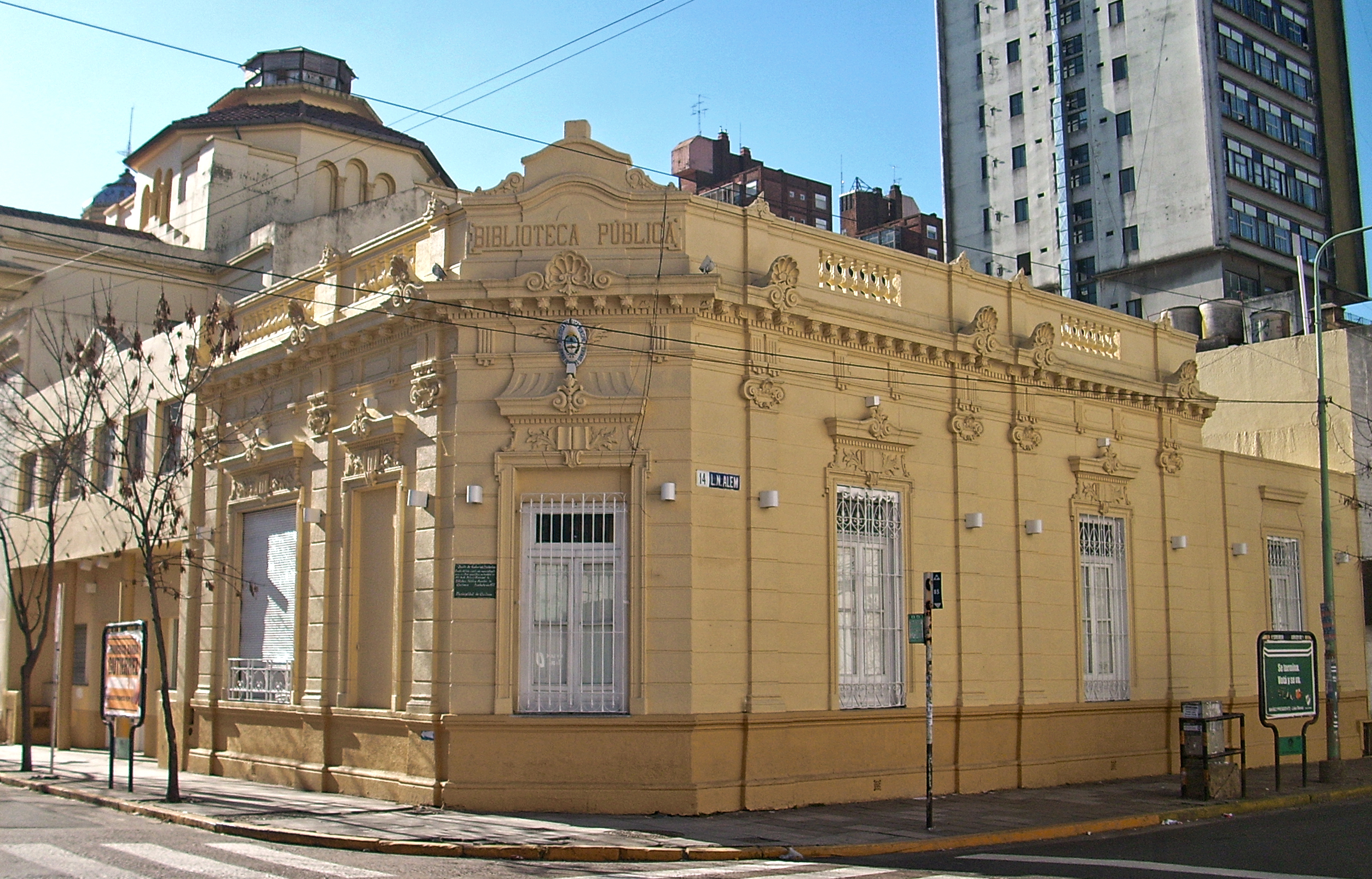
Sarmiento Public Library

Quilmes was also inhabited by British immigrants. Juan Clark, born in Yorkshire, England, was president of the municipality in 1855. The Clark' were owners of land in Quilmes, and were linked to the Irish and Scottish community, established in the area since 1830s.

In 1898 was established in the area the St. George's College, a private educational institution run by the Reverend Joseph Thomas Stevenson.

The town's development accelerated during the wave of immigration in Argentina during the late 19th century, and Quilmes was considered as the location for a new provincial capital during the Federalization of Buenos Aires of 1880 (ultimately established in La Plata). The Argentine Air Force established a 220 ha (540 acre) base in East Quilmes in 1943. In 1944, Impa (Industria Metallurgica y Plastica Argentina) opened Argentina's first airplane plant at Quilmes. Impa had been blacklisted by the United States government due to its connections to Nazi-occupied Austria and fascist figures within Argentina itself. The airplanes were considered of "antiquated design" according to The New York Times.

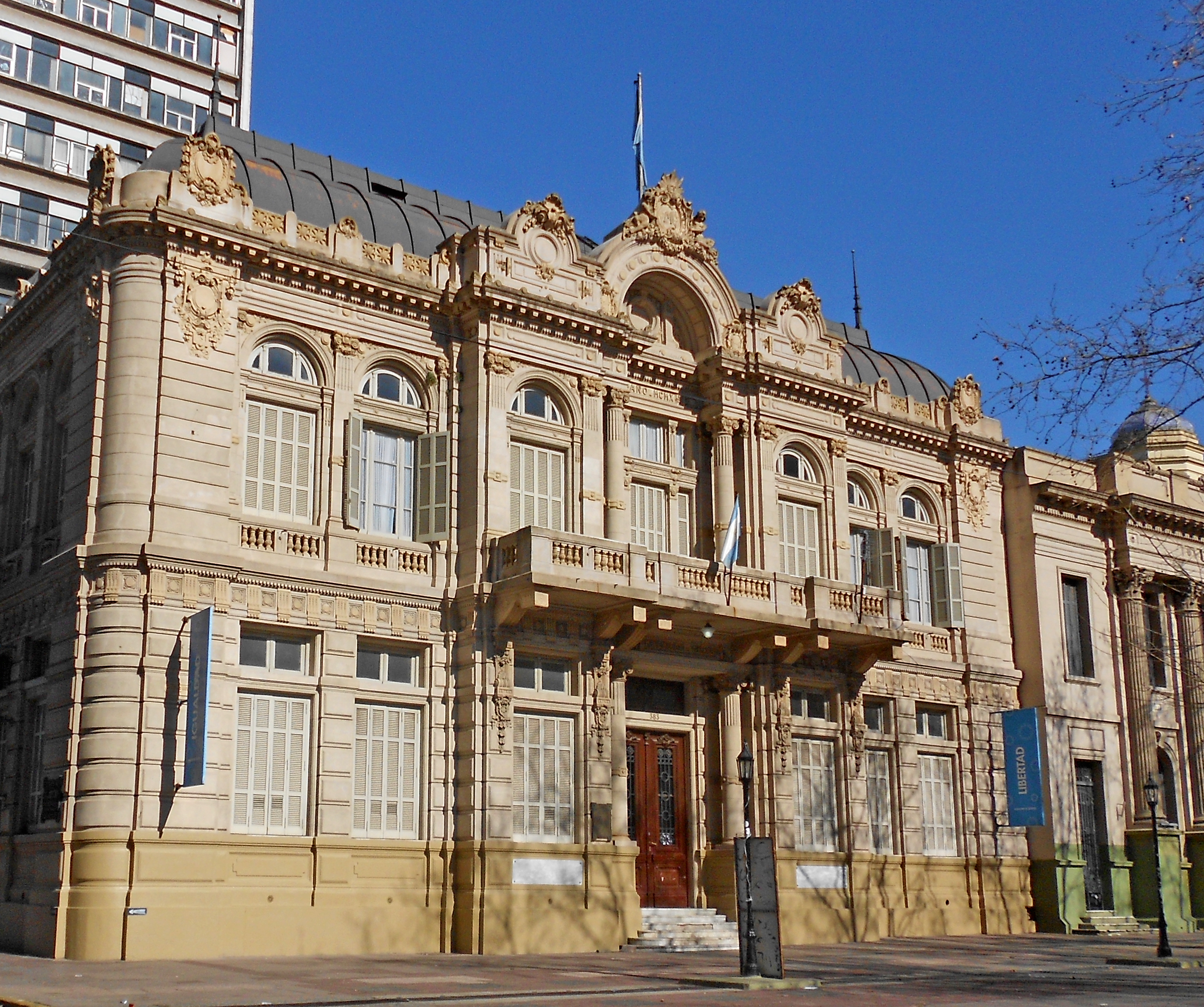
House of Culture of Quilmes

Quilmes proper consists of two main parts, east and west, which are divided by the tracks of the Metropolitano passenger train line. East Quilmes has several relatively wealthy areas and a large shopping district. As one travels east toward the Río de la Plata, neighborhoods become increasingly poor, and two large villas miseria (slums) are found close to the river. These areas often experience severe flooding.

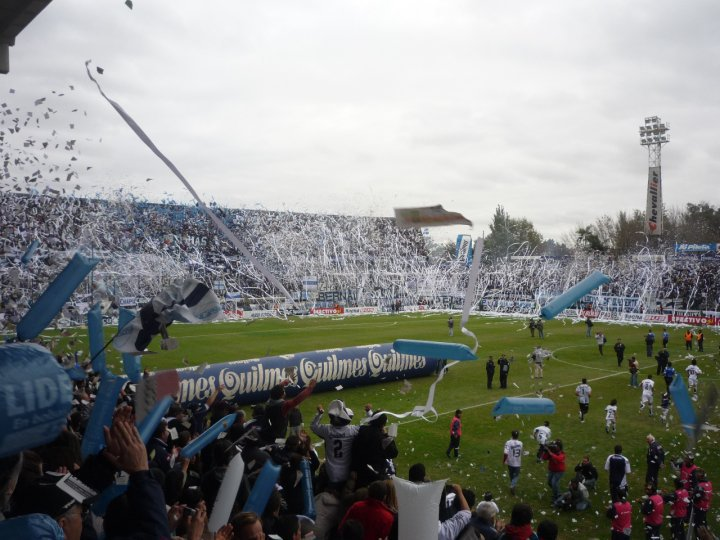
Quilmes Atlético Club's Stadium during a match in 2010.

Quilmes is the home of two football teams: Quilmes Atlético Club and Club Atlético Argentino de Quilmes. The first was founded in the 19th century by Cannon J. T. Stevenson, and the second one was founded later, by Argentines who were not allowed to play for the QAC. They are two of the oldest Argentine football teams. The city has been chosen by FIH to host the 2014 Men's Hockey Champions Trophy.

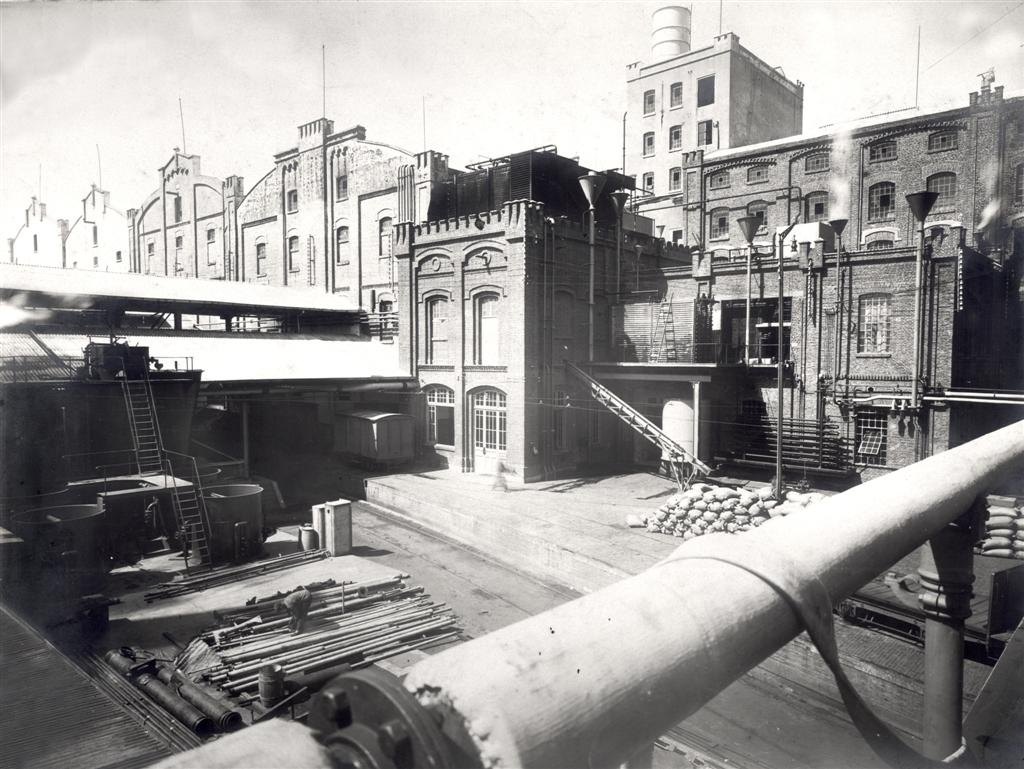
Quilmes' Brewery in early 1900s.

The city also gives its name to the Cerveza Quilmes beer company, as this is where it was first brewed in 1888 where the brewery was started by Otto Bemberg; the establishment remains a leading employer in the city. Other significant manufacturers in Quilmes include textile maker La Bernalesa, glass maker Cattorini, construction materials maker Cerámica Quilmes, and climate control equipment maker Rheem.

== Notable people ==
- Sergio Agüero, football forward
- Julio Arca, former professional football player and current manager
- Rubén Oscar Cocimano (born 1962), former Argentine football played
- Victor de Pol, sculptor
- Aníbal Fernández, former mayor, Minister of Interior, of Justice, Chief of the Cabinet of Ministers, and Senator.
- Susana Giménez, television variety show host
- William Henry Hudson, author of "Far Away and Long Ago, A Childhood in Argentina"
- Sergio Martínez, boxer
- Carlos Morel, painter
- Vox Dei, rock band
- Maria Becerra, singer-songwriter
- Nelda Ramos, multidisciplinary artist, curator and art educator

== See also ==
- List of twin towns and sister cities in Argentina
