= Mayra Mendoza =

Argentine politician

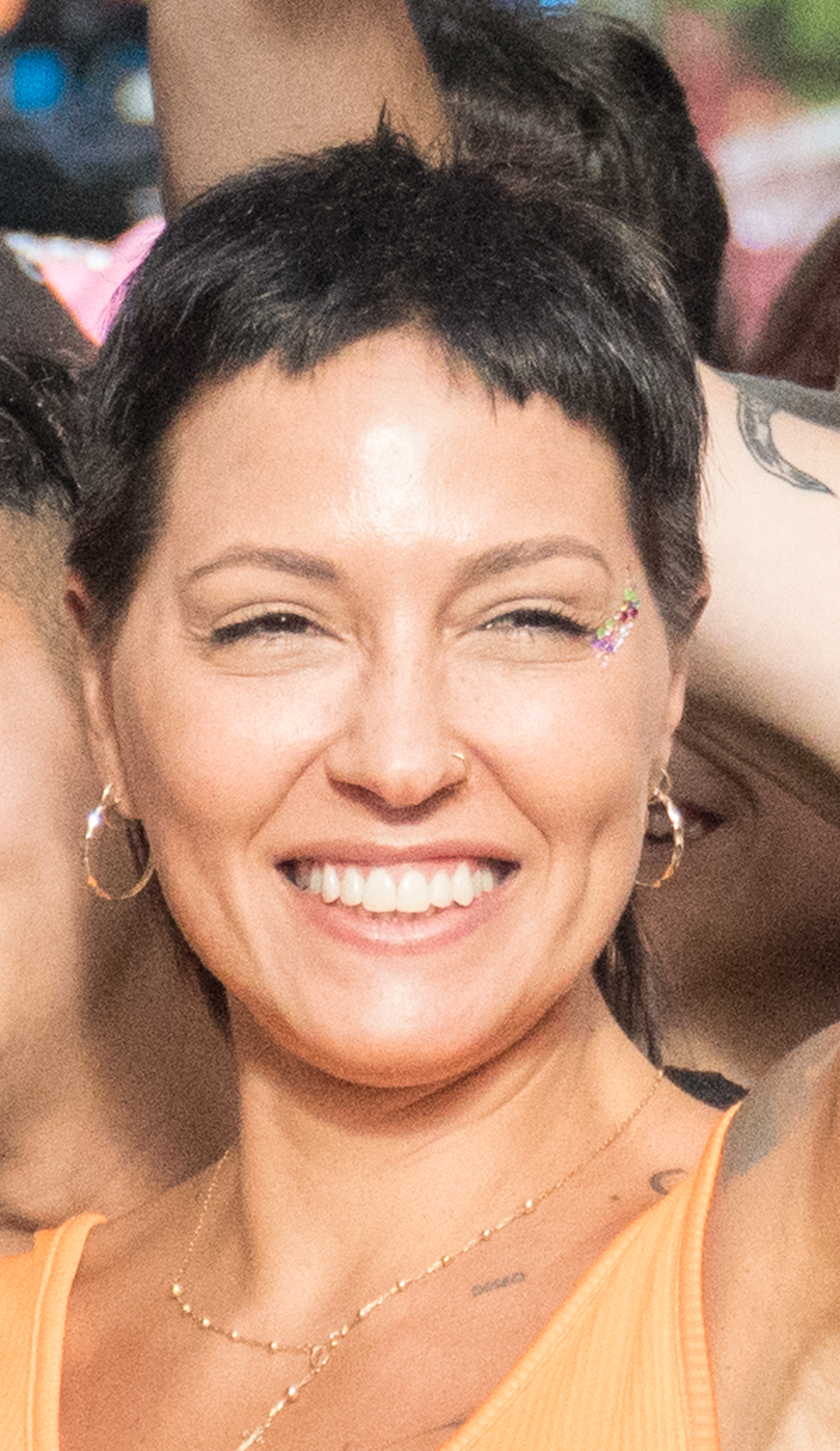

Provincial Deputy of Buenos Aires
- Incumbent
- Assumed office 10 December 2025
- Constituency: Third Electoral Section

Intendant of Quilmes
- In office 10 December 2019 – 10 December 2025
- Preceded by: Martiniano Molina
- Succeeded by: Eva Mieri (interim)

National Deputy
- In office 10 December 2011 – 10 December 2019
- Constituency: Buenos Aires

Personal details
- Born: Mayra Soledad Mendoza; November 26, 1983 (age 42) Quilmes, Buenos Aires Province, Argentina
- Party: Justicialist Party, La Campora
- Other political affiliations: Front for Victory (2003–2017); Citizen's Unity (2017–2019); Frente de Todos (2019–present)
- Domestic partner(s): José Ottavis (2006–2014); Sebastián Daer (2014–present)
- Children: Catalina (b. 2015)

Mayra Soledad Mendoza (born 26 November 1983) is an Argentine politician. She currently serves as a member of the Buenos Aires Province Chamber of Deputies, having previously served as intendenta (mayor) of Quilmes, the first woman to hold the position. From 2011 to 2019 she served as National Deputy.

She is a member of the Justicialist Party and La Cámpora.

== Early life ==
She was born in a radical family. In her teenage years she taught support classes in a community canteen in her town. She began to be part of La Cámpora group since its creation in 2006, becoming in 2011 the only woman on the national leadership table. Previously, in June 2008, she had been appointed as organizational secretary. She also participated in the founding of the Peronist Youth of Buenos Aires Province. In 2010 she opened a basic unit in her locality.

== Political career ==
Her first job in politics was with Oscar Batallés, a Quilmes councilor. She later worked as an adviser to the radical senator José Eseverri. She then worked at the Hipódromo de Palermo and the Municipality of Zárate. She has also served as Secretary for Women in the Justicialist Party.

In mid-2009, she was appointed manager of Institutional Relations for the ANSES. In December 2011, she assumed the position of National Deputy for Buenos Aires Province. She was re-elected in 2015.

In 2019, she was nominated as candidate for Intendant of Quilmes. Mayra Mendoza in turn obtained 54.21% of the votes within her space. On October 27 of the same year, she was elected with 49.47% of the votes, becoming the first woman to govern the district.
