= Greater La Plata =

Urban conurbanation in La Plata, Argentina

Gran La Plata (Greater La Plata) is an urban agglomeration formed around the city of La Plata, in Buenos Aires Province, Argentina. It includes the La Plata, Berisso and Ensenada partidos (departments).

== Location ==
Location of Greater La Plata highlighted in pink

Gran La Plata is located to the south of the Greater Buenos Aires agglomeration next to Rio de La Plata. To a small extent, the two metropolitan areas have slowly begun to merge. Nevertheless, the main centres remain separated by two dense forest reserves: the "Punta Lara jungle" ("Selva marginal") by the River Plate, and the "Pereyra Iraola Park" ("Parque Pereyra Iraola") a few kilometers inland.

== History ==
The cities of Berisso and Ensenada existed well before La Plata and were both candidates to become the capital city of Buenos Aires Province once Buenos Aires city was federalized in 1880. Eventually, it was decided to build a new city, La Plata, entirely designed to serve as the provincial capital. It was founded in 1882. Soon after, irregular suburbs began to appear outside the designed limits of La Plata. These suburbs would go on to become an integral part of La Plata Partido municipality. Neighboring Berisso and Ensenada, on the Río de la Plata shore, acted from then on as natural harbors for the new capital city of the Province, and gradually they also became integrated as a conurbation into Greater La Plata.

== Population ==
Settlement	Partido	Population (2010)	Population (2001)
La Plata Partido			774,369
La Plata	La Plata	643,133	
Villa Elvira	La Plata		62,480
Los Hornos	La Plata		54,406
Tolosa	La Plata		44,977
City Bell	La Plata		32,646
Villa Elisa	La Plata		22,229
Manuel B. Gonnet	La Plata		22,963
José Melchor Romero	La Plata		20,730
Ringuelet	La Plata		15,312
Lisandro Olmos	La Plata		15,059
Villa Montoro	La Plata		13,835
El Retiro	La Plata		12,649
Barrio Las Malvinas	La Plata		11,414
Barrio Las Quintas	La Plata		8,003
Barrio Gambier	La Plata		7,477
La Cumbre	La Plata		7,313
Joaquín Gorina	La Plata		6,857
Rufino de Elizalde	La Plata		6,428
Barrio El Carmen	La Plata		5,906
José Hernández	La Plata		5,333
Abasto	La Plata		4,577
Arturo Seguí	La Plata		3,894
Transradio	La Plata		3,713
Ángel Etcheverry	La Plata		2,671
Villa Parque Sicardi	La Plata		1,228
Arana	La Plata		268
Villa Garibaldi	La Plata		242
Berisso Partido		80,092	
Villa Porteña	Berisso		14,343
Berisso	Berisso	87,698	
Villa Progreso	Berisso		7,870
Villa San Carlos	Berisso		7,089
Barrio El Carmen	Berisso		6,894
Villa Dolores	Berisso		6,535
Villa Independencia	Berisso		6,472
Villa Argüello	Berisso		5,662
Villa Zula	Berisso		5,124
Barrio Banco Provincia	Berisso		1,867
Villa Nueva	Berisso		1,585
Barrio Universitario	Berisso		1,032
Los Talas	Berisso		494
Ensenada Partido		56,729	51,448
Ensenada	Ensenada	54,463	
Punta Lara	Ensenada		8,410
Villa Catella	Ensenada		5,959
Dique Nº 1	Ensenada		5,685
Isla Santiago Oeste	Ensenada		237
