= Provincial Route 215 (Buenos Aires) =

Road in Buenos Aires Province, Argentina

Provincial Route 215
- Ruta provincial 215

Route information
- Length: 109 km (68 mi)
- Existed: 1935–present

Major junctions
- Northeast end: Ensenada
- Southeast end: San Miguel del Monte

Location
- Country: Argentina

Highway system
- Highways in Argentina

Provincial Route 215 is a 109-kilometre-long (68 mi) highway in the northeast of the Province of Buenos Aires, Argentina that joins the West Channel in the city of Ensenada and the junction with National Route 3 in San Miguel del Monte.

In the Ensenada Partido, it corresponds to Avenida Horacio Cestino while in the La Plata Partido, it corresponds to Avenida 44. Although the roads are separated to the northeast of the roundabout with the Provincial Route 6, this section does not form a motorway or semi-motorway since the cross streets cross the route level.

== History ==
National Route 215 was in the original plan of national routes of September 3, 1935, linking the cities of La Plata and San Miguel del Monte.

On April 14, 1937, the company hired by the "Dirección Provincial de Vialidad (Buenos Aires Province Road Directorate", government agency that built and maintained roads in Buenos Aires Province) completed the paving work on a road (3 m wide) from the La Plata to Brandsen section.

On December 14, 1979, a bridge over Provincial route 2 near the Ángel Etcheverry district, was inaugurated. Due to its proximity to the town, it was popularly known as "Cruce Etcheverry" ('Etcheverry Crossing').

In 1982, the Directorate of Roads of the Province of Buenos Aires completed the works to add a divided carriageway with reinforced concrete pavement on this highway in the section between Avenida 131 (border of the city of La Plata) and Provincial Route 6, with variable road width according to the distance to the provincial capital.

The route was later transferred to provincial jurisdiction. In 2007 the construction of the second road of the 18 kilometers that separated Provincial Route 6 from the town of Brandsen was announced. During 2009, a tender was called to carry out the work, which was divided into two stages. This time the first would be held, which would extend between Provincial Route 6 and Los Bosquecitos de Brandsen neighborhood, a section of approximately 11 kilometers.

== Major intersections ==
Partido	City	km	mi	Exit	Destinations	Notes
Ensenada	Ensenada	1.0	0.62	2	to (north and south)	R15 from Punta Lara (north) to Berisso (south), both sides end in R11
La Plata	La Plata	5	3.10	2	to Punta Lara (north) – Mar del Sur (south)	
La Plata	La Plata	7	4.34	–	FCR's La Plata – Policlínico line	Level crossing (active) – University train of La Plata
La Plata	Lisandro Olmos	19	11.80	2	to (north) – (south)	R36 from F. Varela to Punta Indio (south)
La Plata	Lisandro Olmos	25.7	15.96	2	to (north) – Mar del Plata (south)	R2 from F. Varela (north) to Mar del Plata (south)
La Plata	Abasto	28	17.39	1	to (north)	R6 to Zárate (north)
Brandsen	Brandsen	41	25.47	2	to (north)	R53 to Villa La Florida (north)
Brandsen	Brandsen	45.6	28.33	–	FCR's Constitución – Mar del Plata line	Level crossing (active)
Brandsen	Brandsen	45.7	28.39	1	to (south)	R29 to Balcarce (south)
Brandsen	Brandsen	47	29.20	1	to (north)	to Remedios de Escalada, GBA (north)
Monte	Blandengues	106	65.86	2	to (south) – Av. Costanera (north)	R41 from Castelli (south) to Baradero (north)
Monte	S.M. del Monte	109	67.72	2	to (north) – Tierra del Fuego (south)	R3 from Lomas del Mirador, GBA (north) to Tierra del Fuego (south)
1.000 mi = 1.609 km; 1.000 km = 0.621 mi
