= Provincial Route 6 (Buenos Aires) =

Provincial Route 6
- Ruta provincial 6

Route information
- Length: 177 km (110 mi)
- Existed: 1967–present

Major junctions
- North end: Zárate
- South end: Ángel Etcheverry

Location
- Country: Argentina

Highway system
- Highways in Argentina

Provincial Route 6 is a 177 km interurban road (numbered from km 30 to km 210), located on the outer edge of Greater Buenos Aires, in the metropolitan part of the province of Buenos Aires and extends from Provincial Route 215 in the town of Ángel Etcheverry (Greater La Plata) to the city of Zárate.

== History ==
This ring road was built in the decades of 1960 and 1970 to ease access to the country's capital (Buenos Aires) of passing heavy traffic. The first paved section of this route, with a length of 38.7 km between the cities of Campana and Luján, was built by the contractor company Marengo, which completed the works in 1967. The same year, the works to open a trace with a dirt road were completed in two sections: one of 73.2 km between Luján and Cañuelas built by Santos Giovannini and another of 33.3 km between Cañuelas and San Vicente by Prates y Cía. On April 26, 1972, the Marengo construction company completed the paving work on the section between San Vicente and the Partido de La Plata.

Over time, industrial poles were installed in the vicinity of this highway, which contributed to the large increase in truck traffic on this route. In 1999 the government of Buenos Aires Province allocated funds to build a highway along the route, but shortly after the change of government the idea was scrapped.

At the beginning of the decade of 2000, the national State ceded to the province of Buenos Aires the section of National Route 12 from its beginning at the junction with National Route 9 in Campana (km 76) until the access roundabout to Zárate (km 84). This section was added to Provincial Route 6. By Provincial Law 13,281 published in the Official Gazette on January 7, 2005, this section was named "Dr. Federico Jorge Hotton".

On May 18, 2003, the construction of the 187 km highway with a concrete road began, divided into eight sections, the first of which is an extension of the route to Berisso. The work was inaugurated in sections from north to south, starting from the city of Campana.

At the beginning of 2010, a dual carriageway from Zárate to the junction with the Acceso Oeste in the Luján Partido, was inaugurated. The section between Acceso Oeste and Cañuelas was under repair, with only one hand to travel. In May 2015, the double-track works were completed on the entire route, and the formation of a company in charge of maintaining the route through toll collection was announced.

In 2012, the then-governor of Buenos Aires, Daniel Scioli, revoked the concession to the private company after several demands from the provincial government towards the company to advance in a delayed third lane. Under the orbit of the Secretary of Public Services, the company advanced with the third lane, the two traditional lanes were repaved, lighting fixtures were replaced and a monitoring center with 180 cameras was created.

Finally, with the change of government, the province decided that the state-owned company AUBASA would be in charge of the maintenance, and conservation of Ruta 6, which would be also a toll road.

== Major intersections ==
Partido	City	km	mi	Exit	Destinations	Notes
La Plata	Etcheverry	0	0	2	Ensenada (east) – S.M. del Monte (west)	
La Plata	Buchanan	11	6.83	1	to (north)	
San Vicente	San Vicente	22	13.67	2	Banfield (north) – Brandsen (south)	
San Vicente	San Vicente	31	19.26	1	Longchamps (north) – Gob. Udaondo (south)	Dirty road from the roundabout to the south
San Vicente	San Vicente	44	27.34	1	to Canning (north)	
Cañuelas	Cañuelas	60	37.28	2	Luis Guillón (north) – Cañuelas (south)	
Cañuelas	Cañuelas	62	38.52	2	San Justo (BA) (north) – Tierra del Fuego (south)	
Marcos Paz	Marcos Paz	84	52.19	2	to (north) – (south)	R40 from Merlo (north) to Navarro (south)
General Rodríguez	General Rodríguez	104	64.62	2	to (north) – B. Sommer Hospital (west)	
Luján	Luján	120	74.56	2	(west) – (east)	This crossing is known as the old bridge to Luján. RP7 extends from that city to Ituzaingó, Buenos Aires.
Luján	Luján	121	75.18	2	Mendoza Province (north) – Buenos Aires (south)	In that crossing, RN7 is "AU del Oeste"
Luján	Open Door	133	82.64	1	Access to RP192	RP192 ends in Luján (west)
Exaltación de la Cruz	Exaltación de la Cruz	142	88.23	2	San Luis Province (west) – Malvinas Argentinas Partido (east)	
Campana	Campana	169	105	2	Jujuy Province (north) – Buenos Aires (south)	
Zárate	Zárate	177	109.98	2	to Ceibas (ER) (north) – RN193 to (west)	Both routes, RN193 and RN8, depart from RP6
