= Manuel B. Gonnet =

City in Buenos Aires Province, Argentina

- City
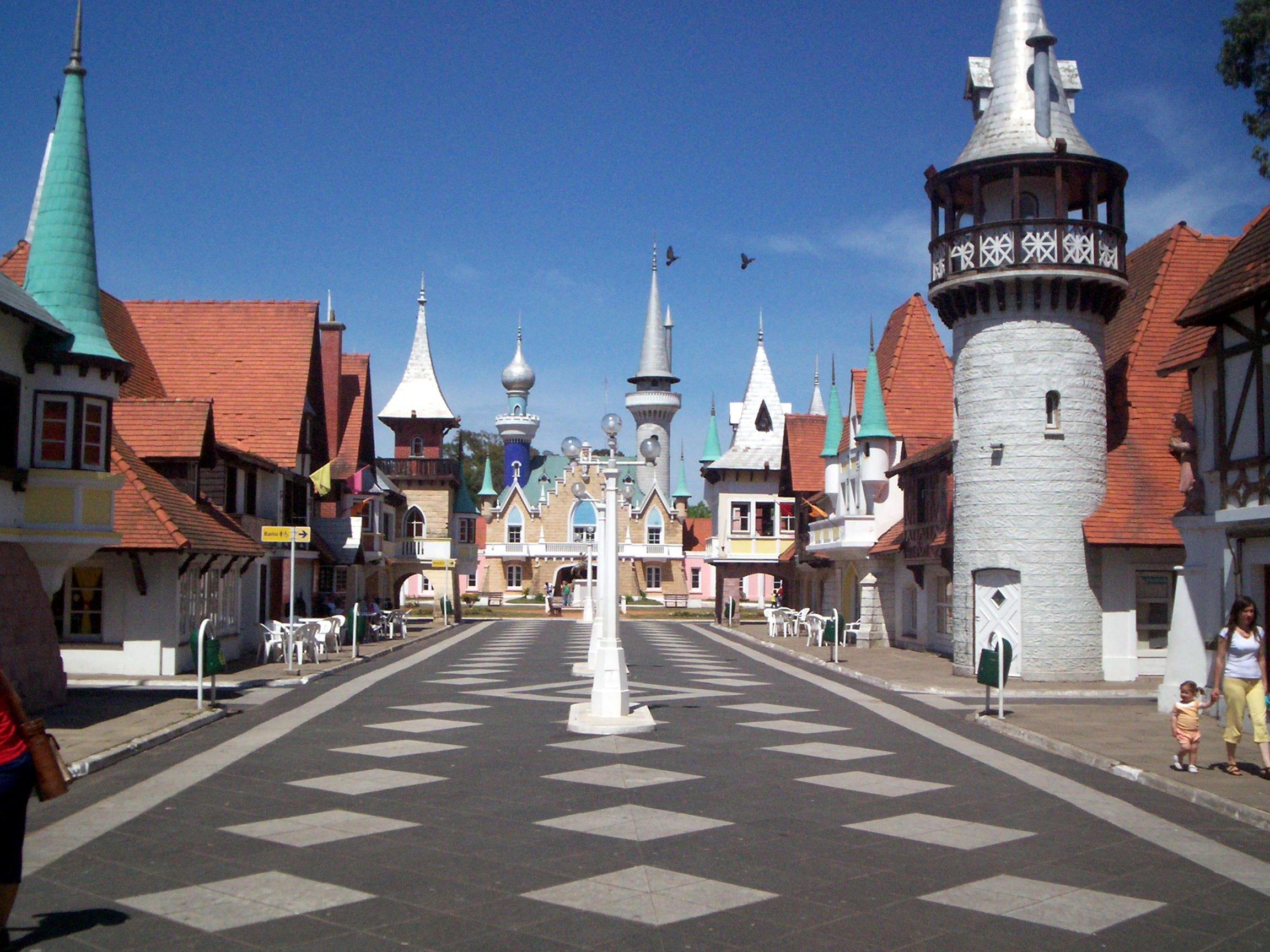
- The Children's Republic

- Location in Argentina
- Coordinates: 34°53′22.7″S 58°01′9.7″W
- Country: Argentina
- Province: Buenos Aires
- Partido: La Plata
- Elevation: 3 m (9.8 ft)

Population (2001 census [INDEC])
  - Total: 22,963
- CPA Base: B 1897
- Area code: +54 221

Manuel B. Gonnet is a neighborhood in La Plata Partido, Argentina. It is part of a group of neighborhoods developed around the then Buenos Aires Great Southern Railway (later Ferrocarril General Roca) connecting La Plata with Buenos Aires, and Tolosa, Ringuelet, City Bell and Villa Elisa.

It is named after Manuel Bernardo Gonnet, first provincial minister of Public Works (after the Federalization of Buenos Aires) and provincial legislator.

According to the 2001 Census INDEC, Manuel B. Gonnet has a population of 22,963 in 2.335 ha (5.8 acres).

== History ==
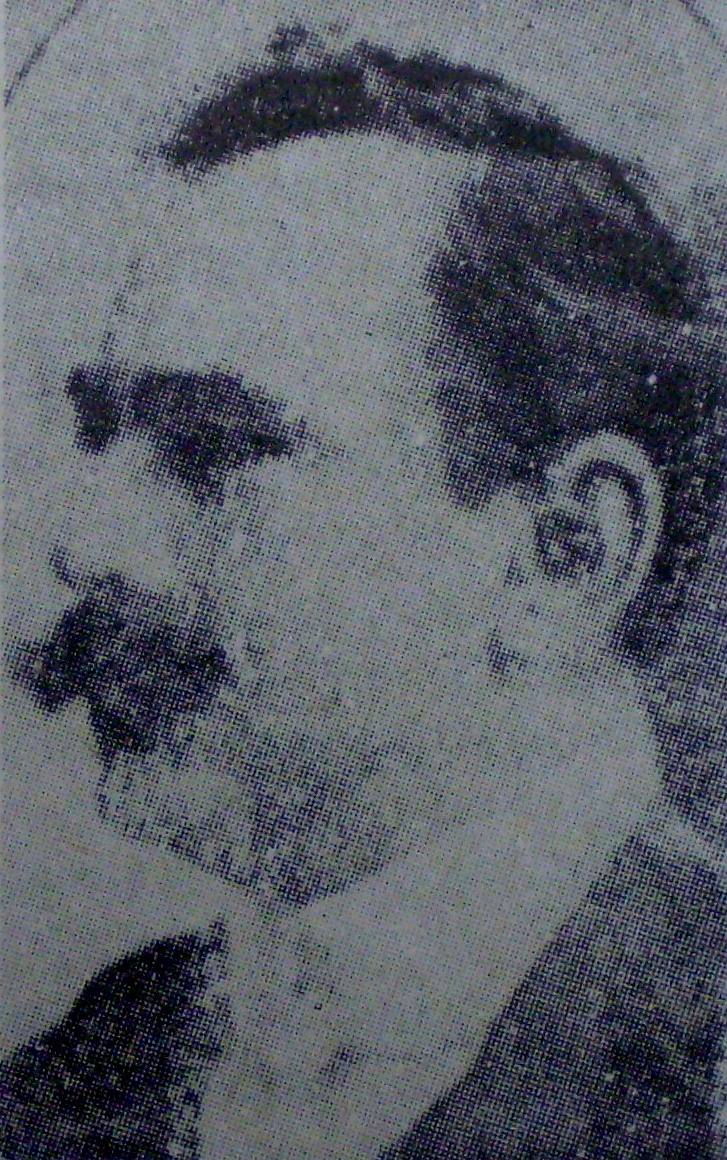
Manuel B. Gonnet

On 13 July 1882 the provincial government started construction of new railroad branches to connect the new provincial capital with the Buenos Aires Western Railway and the Buenos Aires Great Southern Railway. The La Plata - Empalme Pereyra (Villa Elisa) line was opened on 1 January 1889.

In 1889 at the inauguration of the Adolfo Alsina train station, the local landowners decided to start a partnership, subdivide part of the land into lots and found a town. The train station opened on 15 February and on 24 February they announced the establishment of Villa Máximo Paz, named after the then governor. However, the enterprise did not immediately succeed and it took many years to attain a stable population. Initially, the first houses were used as weekend retreats for the rich people of La Plata.

When the population started to become established in 1909, Luis Castells, owner of the land on the north side of the railway decided to fraction and sell his land and started the town of Villa Castells.

In 1931 the city was renamed as Manuel B. Gonnet, joining Villa Máximo Paz and Villa Castells.

In this area, a theme park, the Republic of the Children, of around 53 ha (131 acres) was built in 1951 inspired by the tales and characters of the Brothers Grimm.

== Sports ==
The area is also known for its sports fields and clubs, such as Club Universitario de La Plata, Rugby Club La Plata and Santa Bárbara Hockey Club.

It is also the site of the science campus of the Buenos Aires Province, Science Investigation Commission, the Acoustics and Light Technology Lab, the Center for Optical Research - CIOP, and LINTA. The 9 ha (22 acres) is delimited by Camino Centenario and 505th street, 508th street and 16th street.
