= Club Universitario de La Plata =

Argentine sports club

Universitario (La Plata)
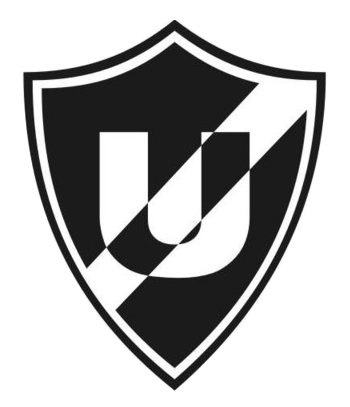
- Full name: Club Universitario de La Plata
- Nicknames: La U Albinegro
- Short name: Universitario
- Sport: List: Aikido; Basketball; Canoe polo; Field hockey; Paddle tennis; Rugby union; Swimming; Taekwondo; Tennis; Volleyball; Waterpolo
- Founded: 6 March 1937; 89 years ago
- Colors
- Chairman: Marcelo Galland
- Affiliations: URBA (rugby); AHBA (field hockey)
- Website: clubuniversitario.org.ar

Club Universitario de La Plata is an Argentine sports club headquartered in La Plata, Buenos Aires Province. Universitario hosts the practise of a wide range of sports and activities that includes aikido, basketball, canoe polo, field hockey, paddle tennis, rugby union, swimming, taekwondo, tennis, volleyball, and waterpolo. The club has also two facilities, one in Manuel B. Gonnet, and another in Ensenada.

The rugby union senior team currently plays in Primera División A, the second division of the Unión de Rugby de Buenos Aires league system, while the field hockey teams are affiliated to the Buenos Aires Hockey Association (AHBA).

== History ==
The club was founded by a group of alumni of National University of La Plata on March 6, 1937. Three days before, they had held a meeting in Colegio Nacional where they expressed the intention of establishing a sports and social club, for which they sent letters to university's teachers and professionals in the city, inviting them to join the club. The first rugby team was formed about 1926 but Universitario would not be affiliated to Argentine Rugby Union until 1928, after having been recommended by Club Universitario de Buenos Aires (CUBA) and Club Atlético San Isidro, which served as sponsors.

During its first years of existence, the club had more than 400 members. In 1939 the institution acquired a house on Calle 46, where it set its headquarters. Between 1941 and 1942 Universitario built a basketball court, which helped the club increase its number of members.

Uniform kit

The gymnastics teacher Benigno Rodríguez Jurado, also a CUBA player and father of Arturo (who would win a gold medal for Argentina in 1928), taught the rugby union rules to a group of young enthusiasts. This is considered the beginning of Club Universitario de La Plata as a rugby union club.

In 1959 the Government of the Province of Buenos Aires donated lands to Club Universitario in order to build club's facilities. Those lands were located in Manuel B. Gonnet, in La Plata Partido. During the decade of the 1970s Universitario added a children's division to its rugby categories.

By 1987 Universitario had 15,000 members so the executives decided to search a facility to satisfy the increasing demand of activities. As Universitario added boating sports in 1989, it landed a former Jockey Club's facility that was not operating due to bankruptcy. The facility would be acquired by Club Universitario at an auction in November 1992. During the 1990 decade, a great number of members left Universitario, which caused financial problems to the club.

The rugby team would be promoted and relegated to lower divisions during the 1980s and 1990s, even reaching the first division in 1996 although Universitario did not last too much time in that level. In 2004 Universitario achieved its second promotion to first division although the team would be soon relegated to the second division, Torneo de la URBA Grupo II.

Universitario was on bankruptcy proceedings in 2012, but the "Ley de Salvataje Deportivo" allowed it to continue operating.

In 2013, Universitario promoted to first division to play the 2014 season.

Universitario was relegated to the URBA's third division, Primera B, in the 2026 season when they finished in the last position.

== Facilities ==
The club has three different facilities where several sports are practised, they are:

| Name | Location | Since | Function / sports | Ref. |
|---|---|---|---|---|
| Social | La Plata | 1938 | Headquarters; volleyball | |
| Gonnet | Manuel Gonnet | 1960 | Aikido, basketball, canoe polo, field hockey, paddle tennis rugby, swimming, taekwondo, tennis, waterpolo | |
| Náutica | Ensenada | 1989 | Water sports | |
