= Road Network of the MERCOSUR =

The road network of the MERCOSUR (Spanish: Eje Vial Cono Sur), is a network of roads and highways in South America, that constitute a transnational system and links Mercosur main cities and access points.

Starting in Brazil, the network links the city of Rio de Janeiro with the cities of São Paulo and Curitiba. From there a coastal highway connects with the city of Florianópolis, the harbour of São Francisco do Sul and Porto Alegre and an occidental highway goes from Curitiba up to Porto Alegre. From Porto Alegre, the network arrives to Rio Grande, and finally to the border with Uruguay in Río Branco.

In Uruguay the network link reaches the cities of Montevideo and Colonia del Sacramento. It is planned that the road network crosses the Rio de La Plata and links with Buenos Aires through a bridge to be constructed that would go from Colonia in Uruguay to Buenos Aires, landing in the area next to the city of Punta Lara. From there the network connects the city of Buenos Aires through the Buenos Aires–La Plata highway. In Argentina the network has a branch that goes to the city of San Luis, traversing the city of Río Cuarto and finalizing in Mendoza. In Mendoza, the road crosses the Andes through the Cristo Redentor tunnel, reaching the cities of Santiago de Chile and Valparaíso in Chile. It is planned to construct a new tunnel through the Andes, starting in the zone of Horcones, as this area has a lower altitude than the one serving the Cristo Redentor tunnel, the way will be able to be operative all the year around.
