= Barragán cove =

Small bay near Buenos Aires

Coordinates: 34°49′S 57°54′W

The Ensenada de Barragán ("Barragán's Bay, or Cove") is a small bay on the Río de la Plata, some 40 kilometres (25 mi) southeast of Buenos Aires, Argentina. The area is in the Ensenada district of Buenos Aires province, centred on the city of the Ensenada. The old cove has partly silted since the 17th century, and the area is now considered to be part of Isla Santiago (Santiago Island).

The coastal region was first mapped by Magellan in 1520 in his trip around the world; the bay itself was settled by Hernandarias in the early 17th century. In 1629, the land was sold to Antonio Gutiérrez Barragán, hence its toponymy. The town itself was founded in 1801.

Approximate location of Ensenada de Barragán near La Plata and Buenos Aires on the River Plate.

Until the middle of the 19th century, the bay provided a good natural port. The cove was fortified by the Spanish governors, and later by the Viceroys of the River Plate, several times with batteries and a defensive wall. The place came to be known as "Fuerte Barragán" (Fort Barragán, see below). With the foundation of the new capital of Buenos Aires province (La Plata) in 1882, a new port was built between Ensenada and the nearby town of Berisso. The port relies on a dredged channel cutting through the silt of Barragán Bay and Santiago Island (and another natural channel called "Río Santiago") to connect La Plata with the River Plate. The new haven is now known as Port of La Plata, and it is mostly used for industrial freight.

== Fuerte Barragán: A defensive battery on the River Plate ==
On 2 January 1801 Viceroy Marqués de Avilés granted Colonel Pedro Cerviño the settlement of a town at the Ensenada de Barragán. He was also responsible for building the first defensive wall at Fuerte Barragán (Fort Barragán), as well as its eight-cannon battery.

The Ensenada de Barragán played an important role during the British invasions of the Rio de la Plata. In June 1806, Fort Barragán was commanded by Santiago de Liniers and repulsed the first landing of the British under General Beresford; the invading army was forced to come ashore at Quilmes, some 20 kilometres (12 mi) upstream. On the second British invasion in June 1807, however, the fort was left unmanned and it was captured by Lieutenant-General Whitelocke.

The fort was rebuilt under the direction of Pedro Benoit in 1855 and again by the Buenos Aires province in 1911. Since 1985, it is a Historic Museum managed by the municipality of Ensenada.

== See also ==
- Battle of Ponta de Santiago
