= The Children's Republic =

Amusement park in La Plata, Argentina

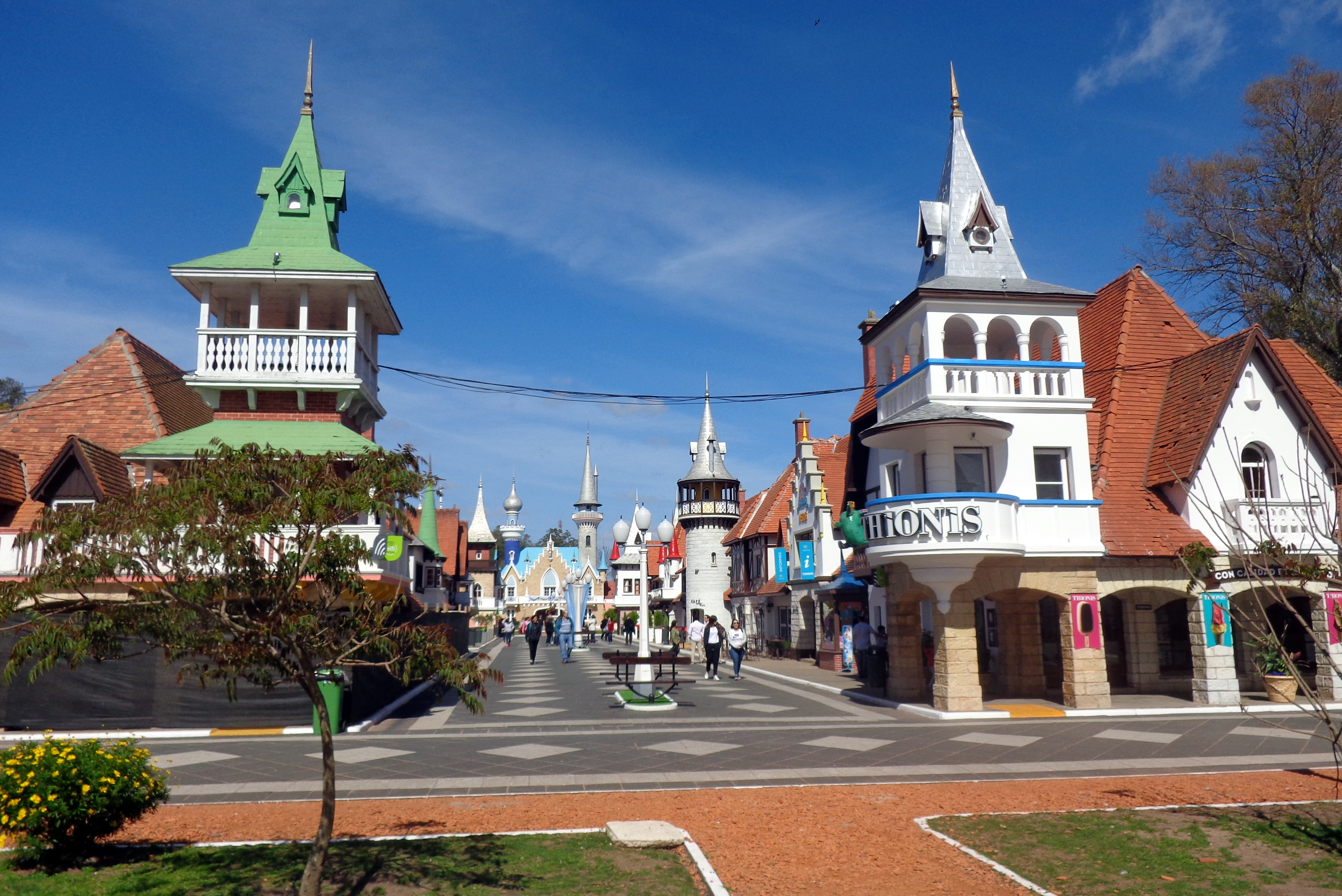
- View of the civic center

- Location in Buenos Aires Province
- Location: Gonnet, La Plata, Argentina
- Coordinates: 34°53′10.5″S 58°1′7″W
- Opened: November 26, 1951; 74 years ago
- Owner: Municipality of La Plata
- Area: 0.52 km^{2} (0.20 sq mi)
- Website: republica.laplata.gob.ar

The Children's Republic (Spanish: República de los Niños), is a theme park located in La Plata, Argentina. With a surface of 53 hectares (130 acres), and 35 scale buildings, it is regarded as the first theme park in the Americas. The Republic represents a city (proportionally sized for children) with all its institutions: parliament, government house, the courthouse, church, port, theater, airport, restaurants, hotels, etc.

It was built by the "Investor Institute of the Province of Buenos Aires" on 53 hectares of land where the Swift Golf Club had its course. It was inaugurated on November 26, 1951, by President Juan Domingo Perón. Its architectural similarity to Disneyland allowed the emergence of an urban myth, which affirms that Walt Disney was inspired in this park to found several years later the one located in California.

== History ==
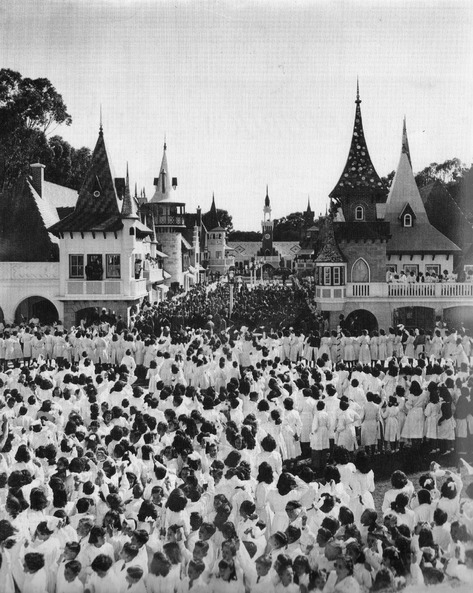
Group of students during the inauguration of the Republic of the Children

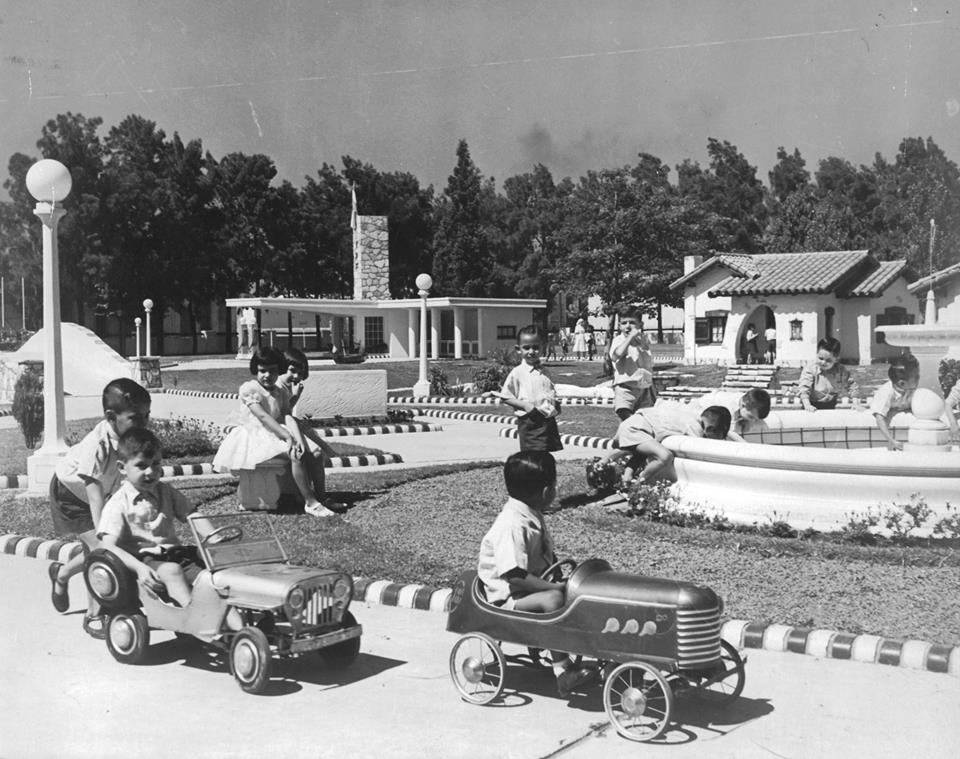
Children playing at the safety road sector in the 1950s

In the official project, the instigator of the idea, Colonel Domingo Mercante, governor and founder of the "Investor Institute of the Province of Buenos Aires", proposed: "we want to put the child in an environment of joyful recreation, in direct contact with the citizen responsibilities of the future, so that when he reaches manhood he will be an Argentine aware of his duties, rights and obligations. At the same time that he has for his first years a kind and imperishable memory, and thus form the best and most generous offspring of him".

The Republic of Children was built on land that was formerly a part of Swift Golf Club. On November 26, 1951, the park was officially opened by the then President Juan Domingo Perón. Eva Perón was unable to attend because she was already suffering from the cancer that would end her life several months later. President Perón signed the "Golden Book" of the inauguration with the slogan: "That in this Children's Republic the Argentines learn to be fair, free and sovereign, so that they can never accept the exploitation of brothers, economic submission and political vassalage".

As part of its educational and recreational function, the institution housed more than 300 children. During this period "Children's Towns" of the same type were also built in Córdoba and Mendoza. After the Coup d'état of 1955 all democratic training programs were abandoned, and the Children's Republic was reduced to a recreational theme park with mechanical games.

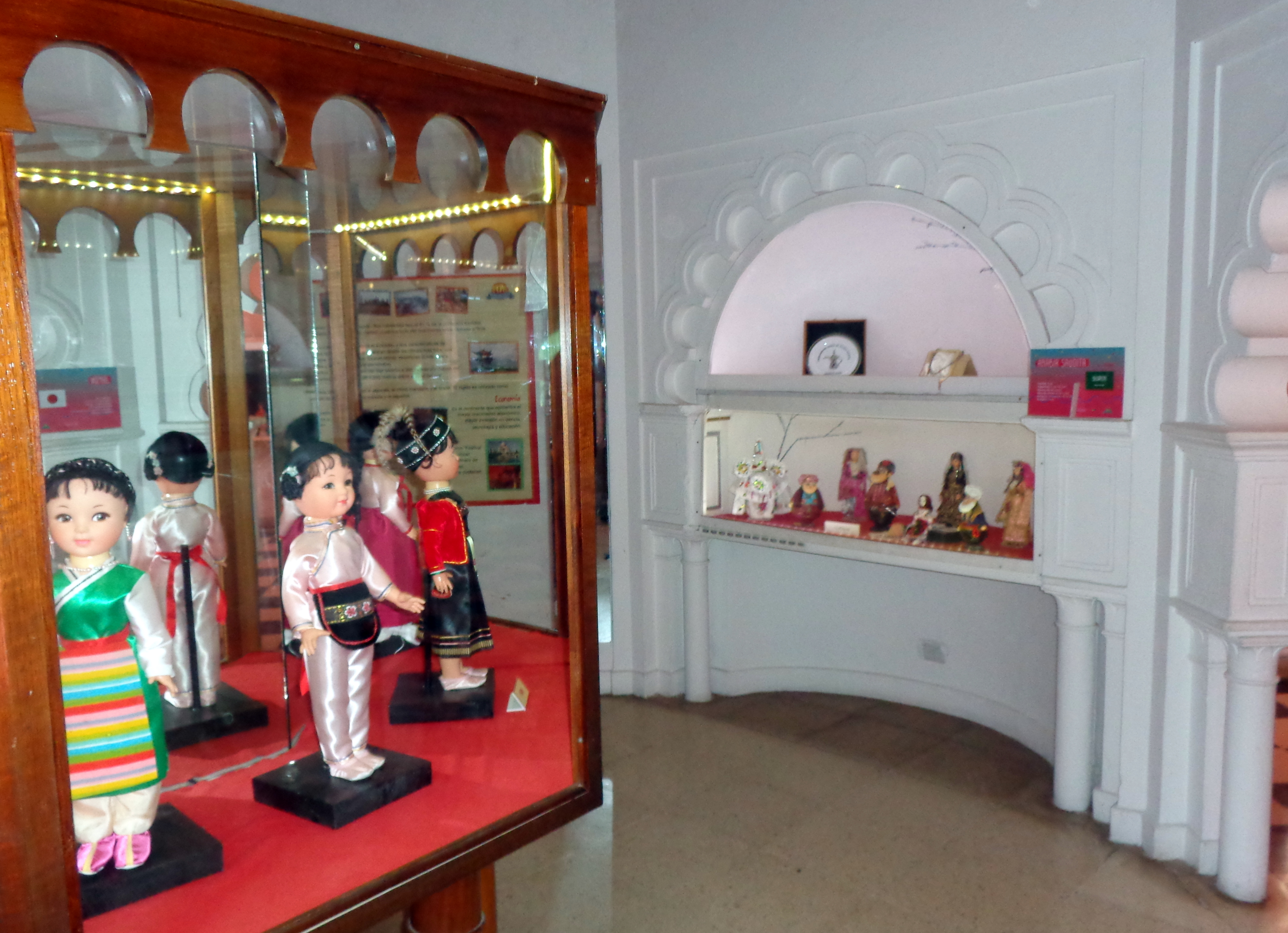
Dolls exhibited in the museum, inaugurated in 1968

In 1968, inspired by Cándido Moneo Sánz, puppeteer and theater director, the "Museo Internacional de los Muñecos" (International Doll Museum) was inaugurated in the Palace of Culture building of the park, with one of the most important collections from Latin America, made up of dolls with typical clothing from different countries.

After the democracy was reestablished in 1973 with Héctor Cámpora elected as president, the Peronist Youth held a great celebration and the symbolic takeover of the facility, considering it a symbol of Peronism. With the resignation of Cámpora a month later, the property was once again abandoned.

During the National Reorganization Process, a decree (n° 1,294, promulgated in 1979) ceded the Children's Republic to the Municipality of La Plata. and suggested its privatization, pursuant to which, major of La Plata Alberto Tettamanti, awarded its operation to the company Zanón Hermanos, concessionaire of the amusement park Italpark, the only bidder. The Civic Center buildings were used for administrative tasks of the concessionaire.

Only with the return to democracy in 1983, the Municipality of La Plata –which had taken over administration of the property since 1979– undertook a policy more akin to the original values, generated educational programs and workshops for students of primary schools and special education.

By law 25,550 promulgated on December 27, 2001, the Congress of Argentina declared the Children's Republic "National Historical Monument".

In August 2008, the government of the Province of Buenos Aires signed an agreement with the National University of General San Martín for a general restoration that included the investigation and historical reconstruction of the buildings. The objective was to reopen the complex in November 2010, as part of the celebration of the Bicentennial of the May Revolution.

== Features ==
The Republic of Children is built on a plot of 52 ha (130 acres). Within, children can explore the various geographic features, natural landscapes, countryside and city. It includes a complete city with all its institutions and centers. Buildings mimic various architectural styles, such as Moorish or neo-Gothic.

The Municipal Bank is a copy of the Child Doge's Palace in Venice, while the Palace of Culture was inspired by the Taj Mahal in Agra; among the well-known halls in the latter building the Carlos Moneo Sáenz Doll Museum. The chapel has large Norman-inspired flat roofs, balcony and bell towers. An aquarium is also housed at the park.

The park was designed both for children's recreation, and for their instruction in republican ethics. Around the Plaza de las Americas is the Legislature, inspired by the British Parliament, which houses the precincts of the Chamber of Deputies and Senators of the Government of the Children's Republic; this body is elected from groups of local students. Once a year on the anniversary of the founding of the Republic, members of the City Council of the City engage in a special session.

A 600 mm (1 ft 11 5/8 in) narrow gauge railway runs through the park, with an extension of 2 kilometres (1.2 mi) and 5 stations. The first locomotive used in the line was made by French company Decauville.

=== Gallery ===
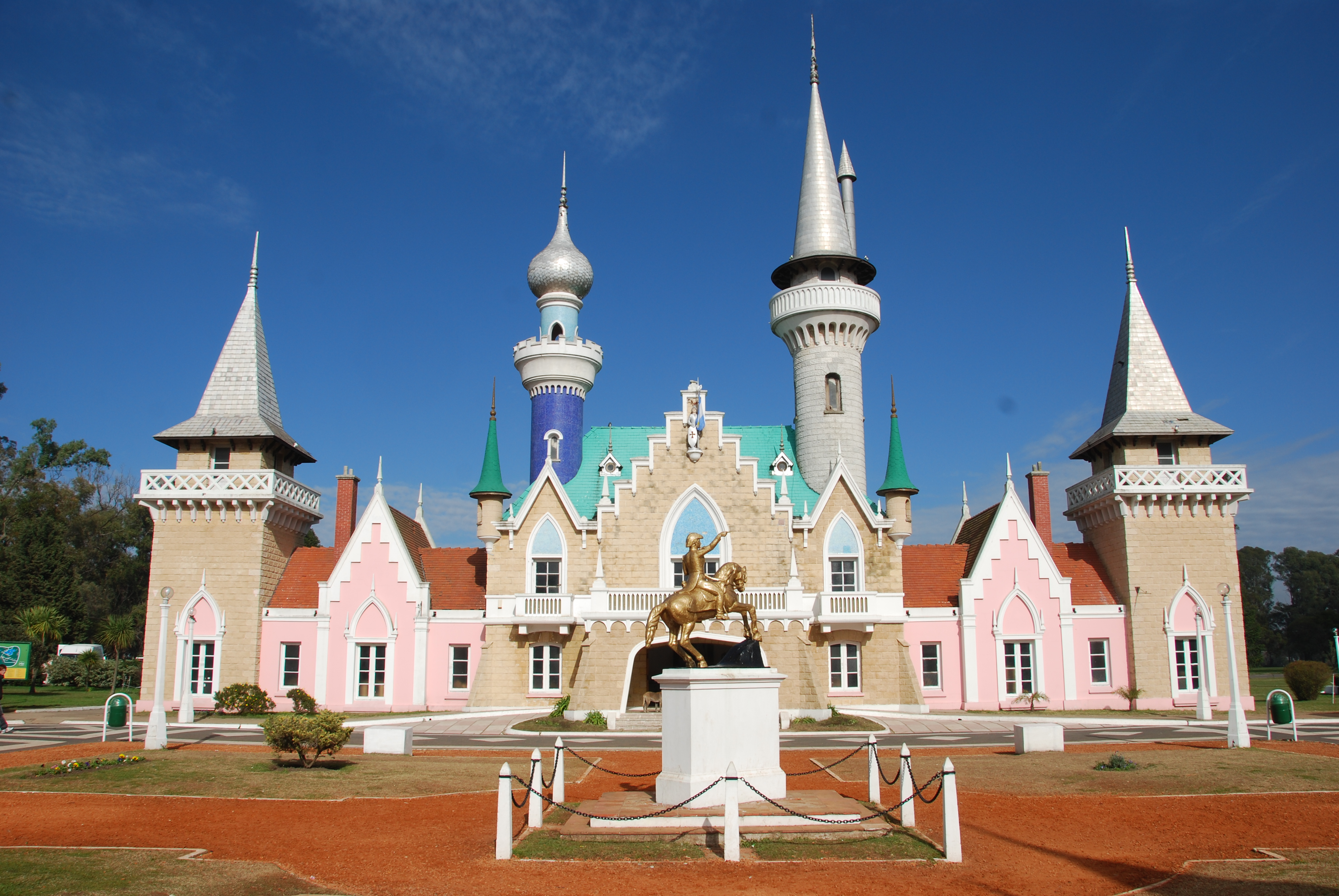
Government House

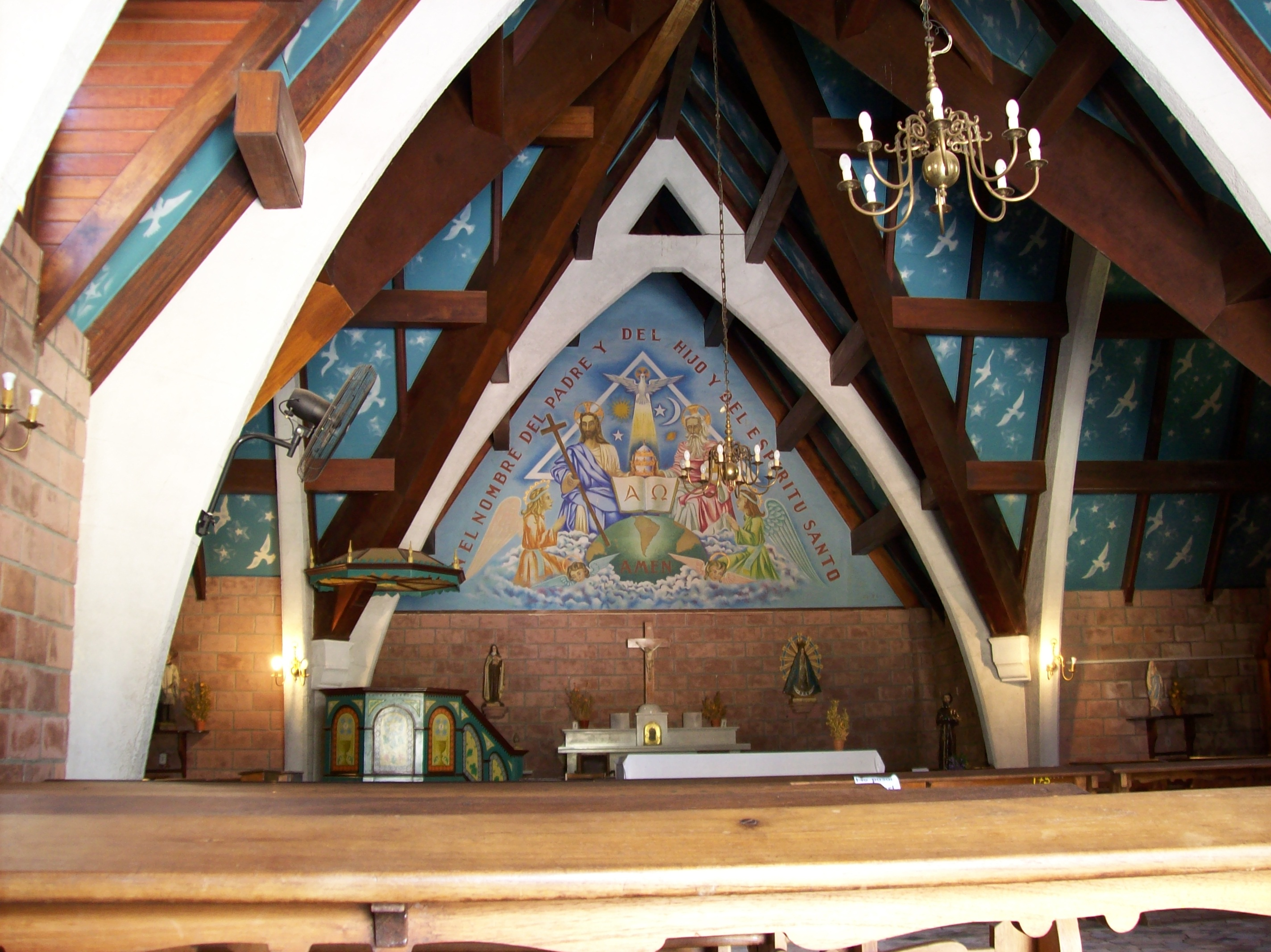
Church

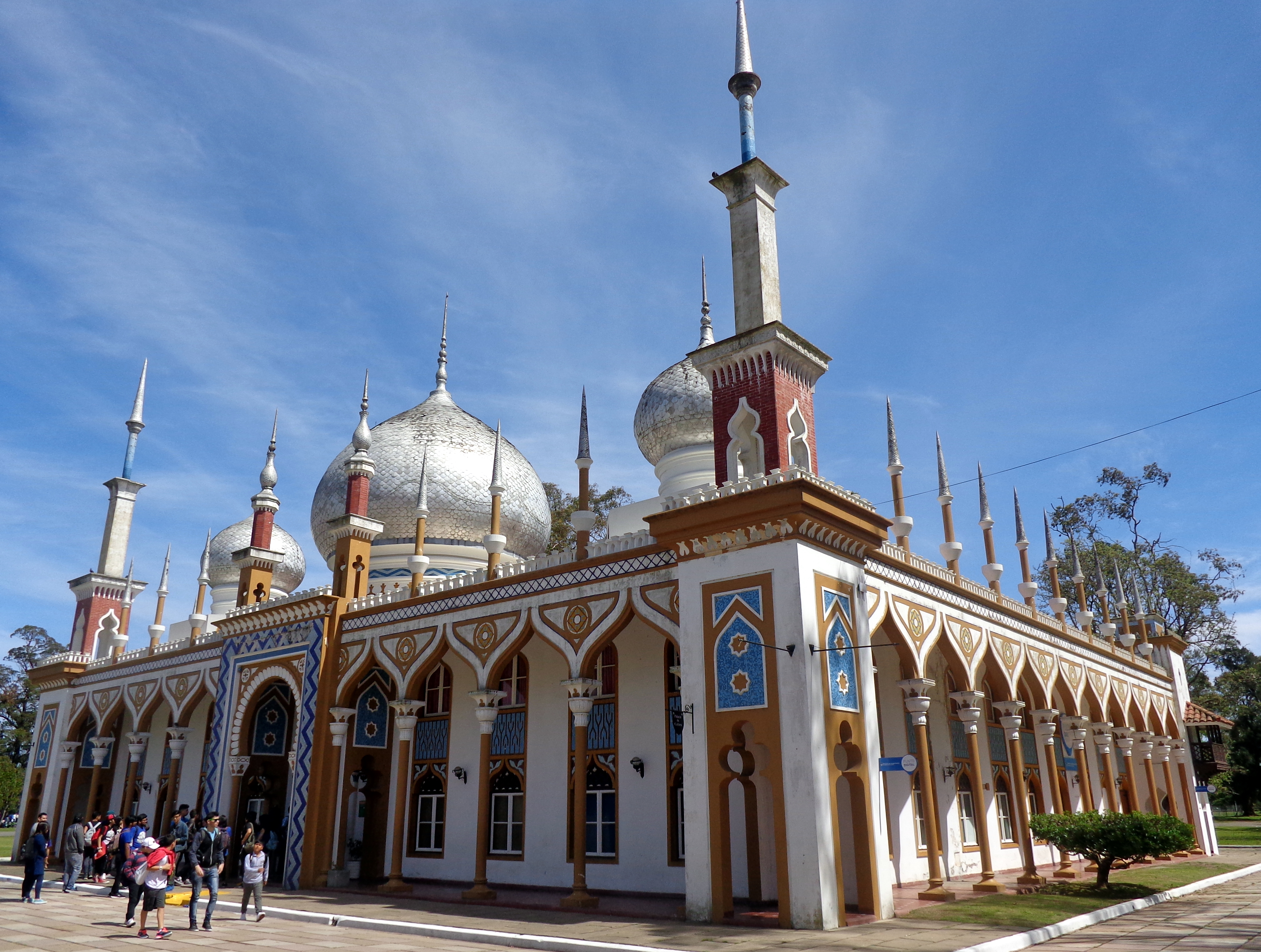
Palace of Culture

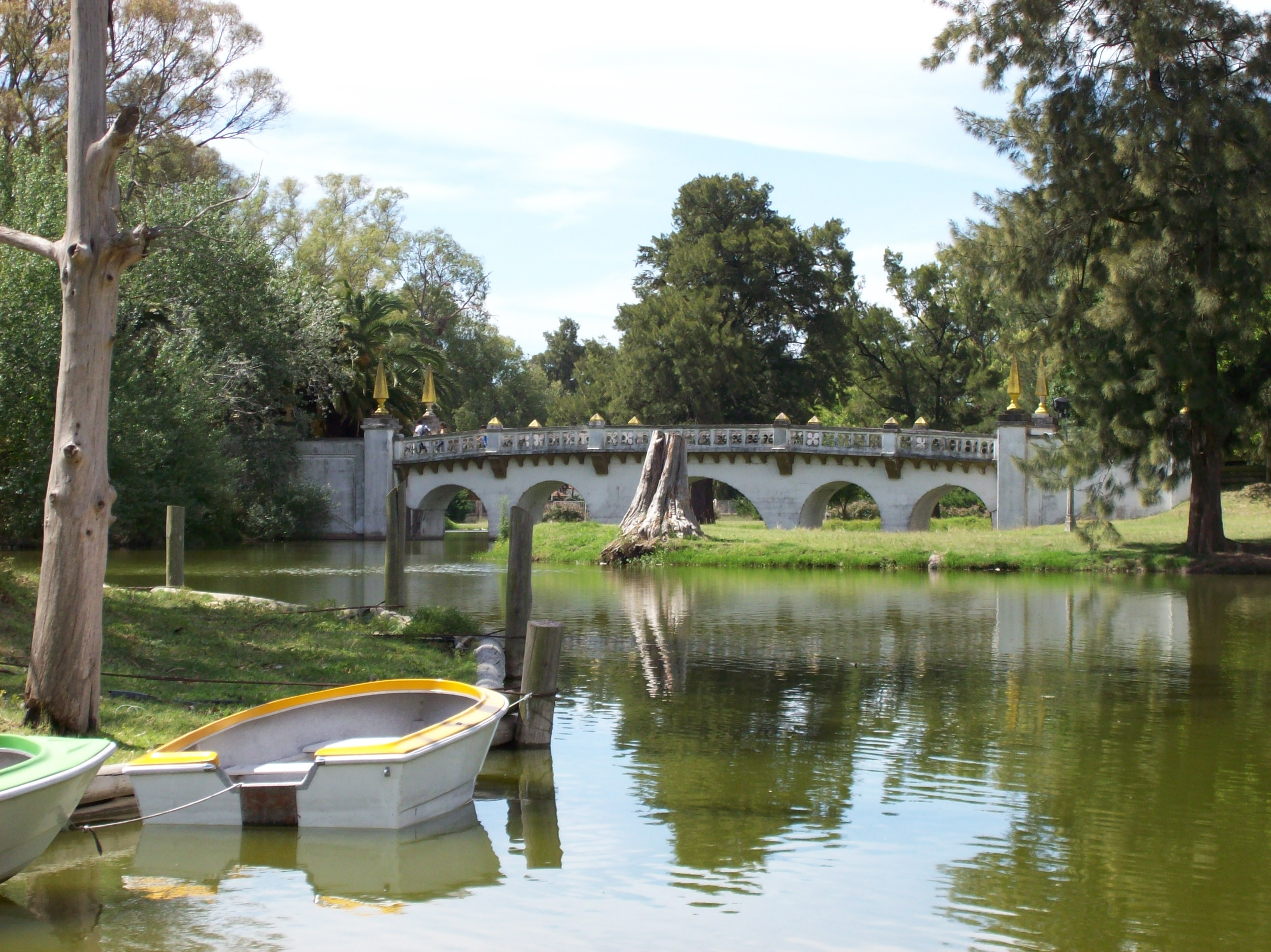
Railway bridge over the lake

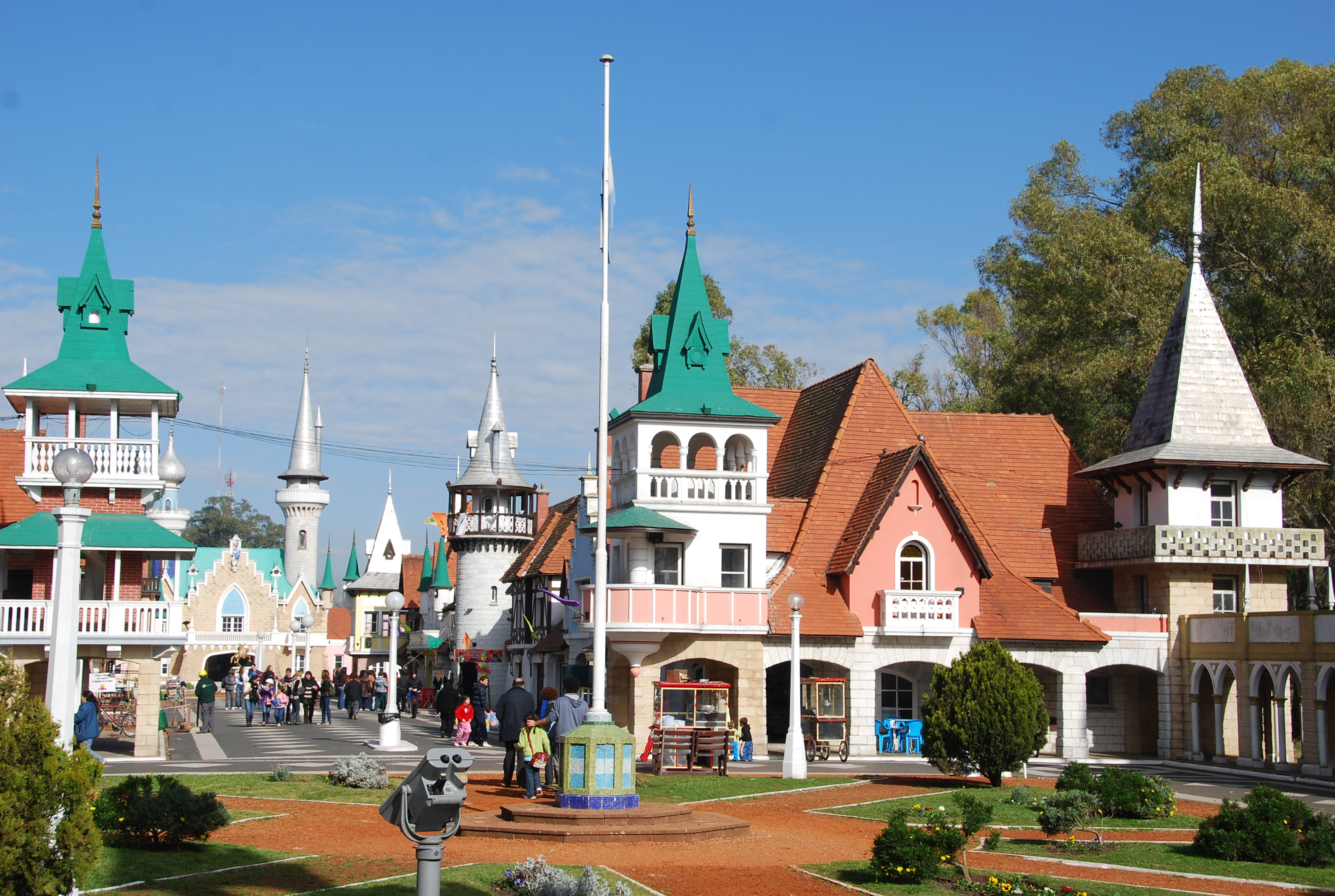
Park of the Americas

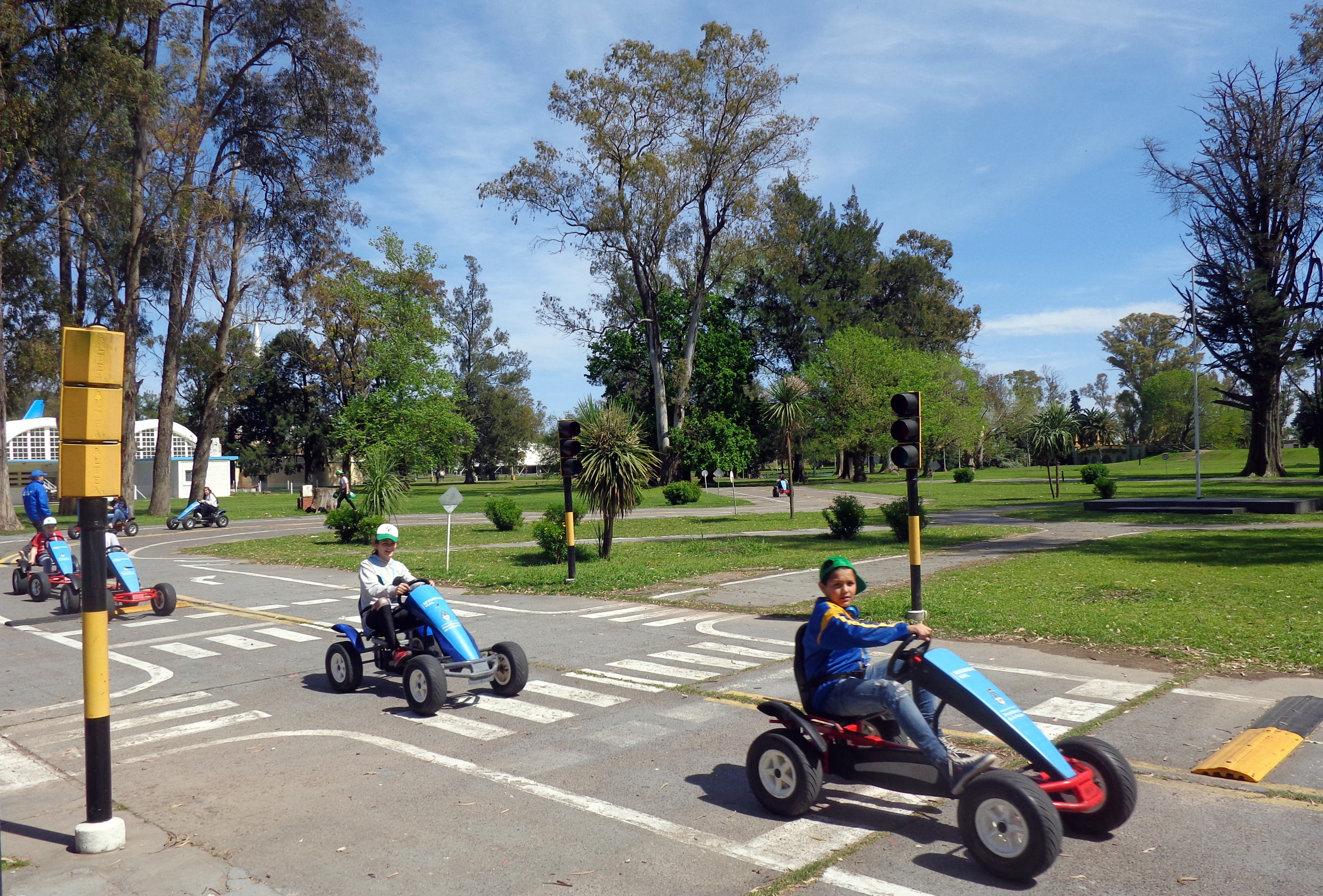
Road safety education

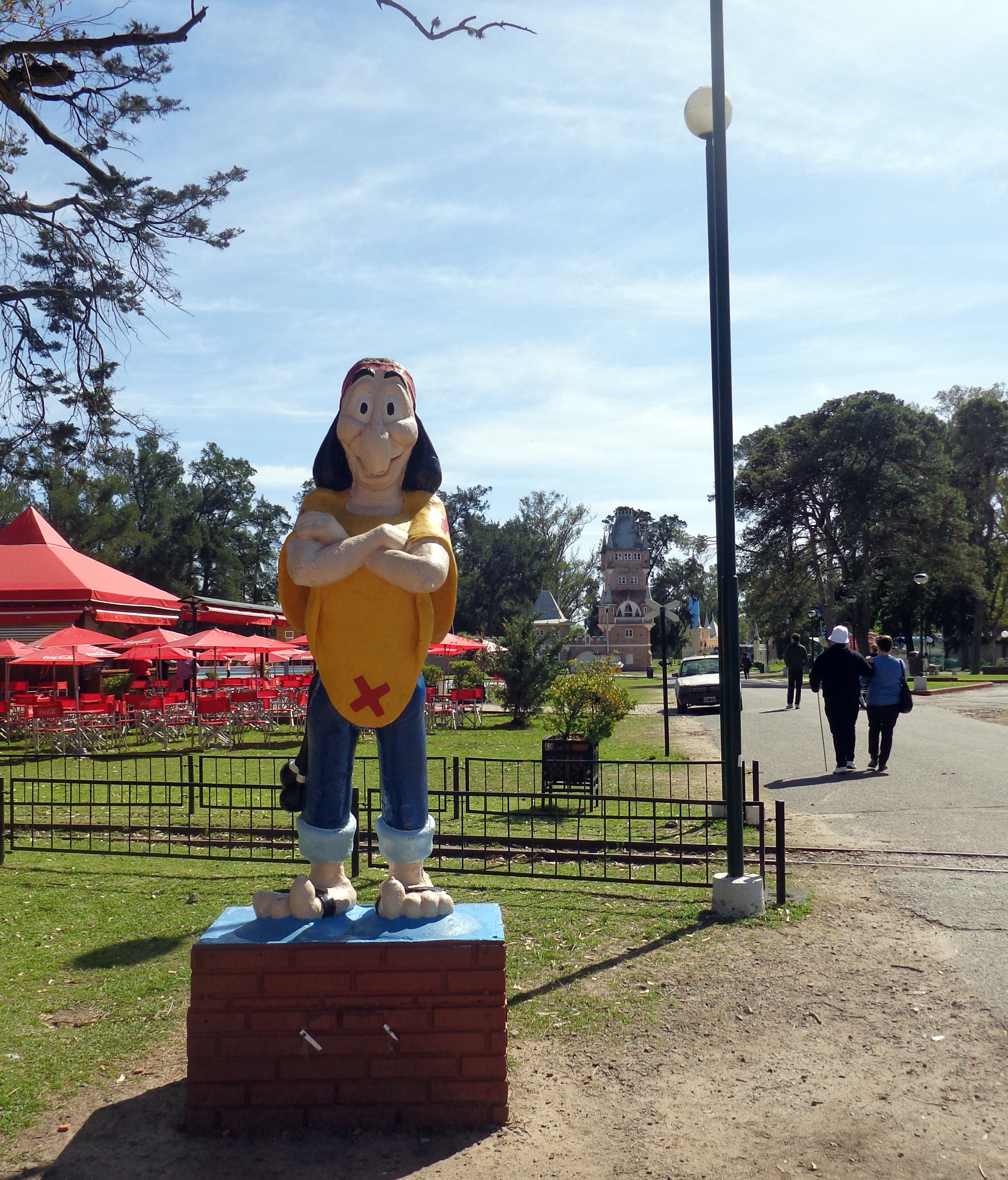
Statue of Patoruzú

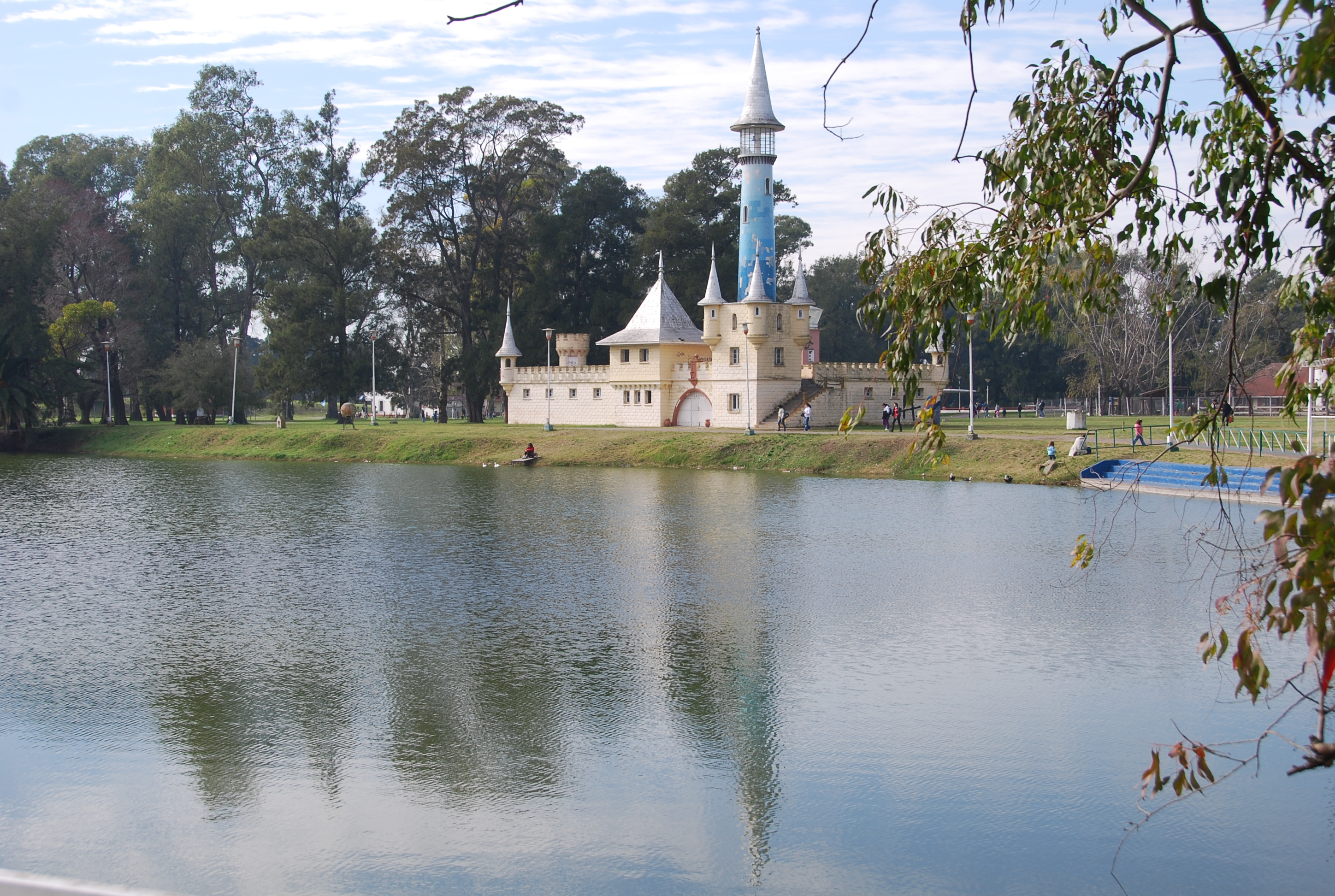
Lake and castle

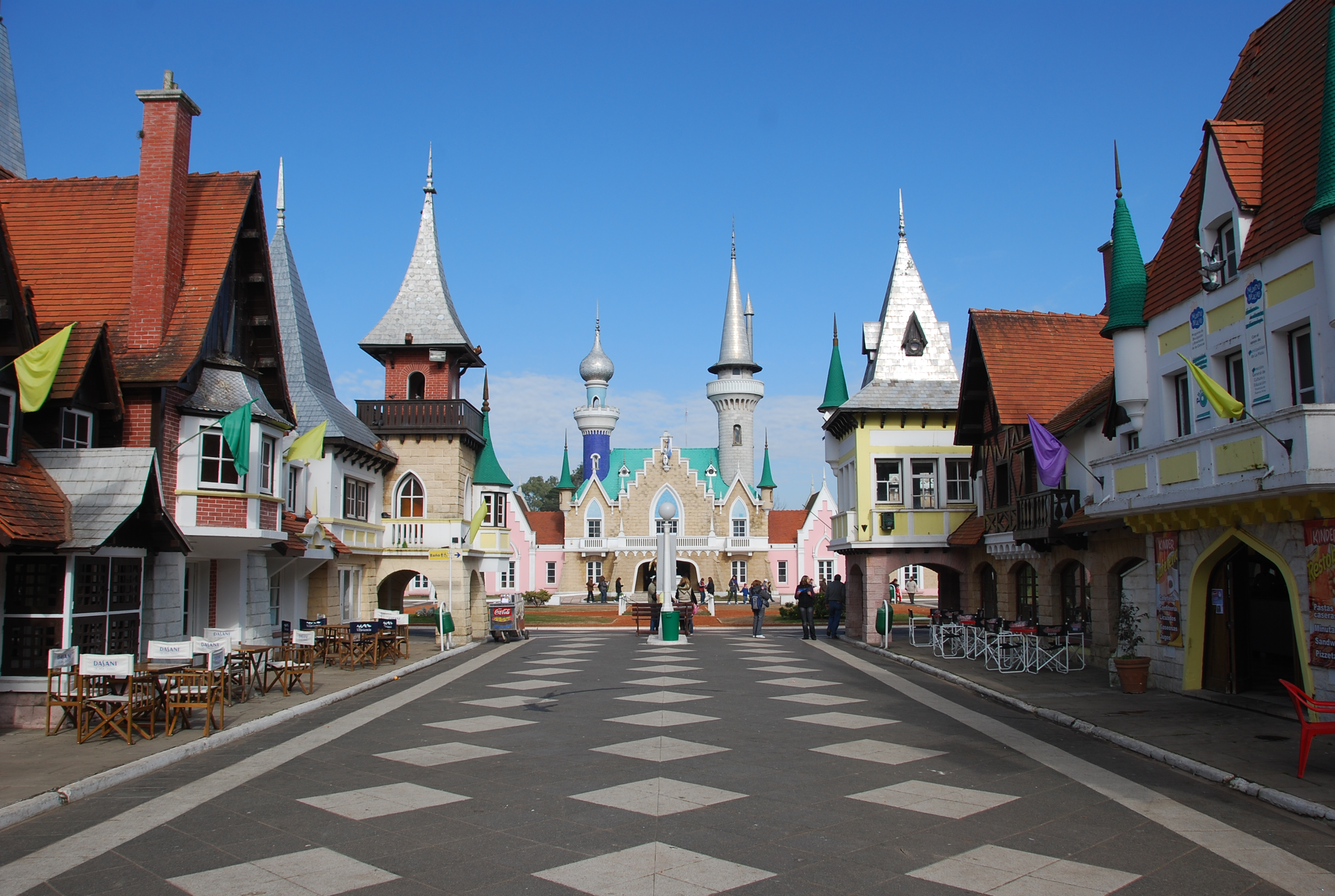
Civic center

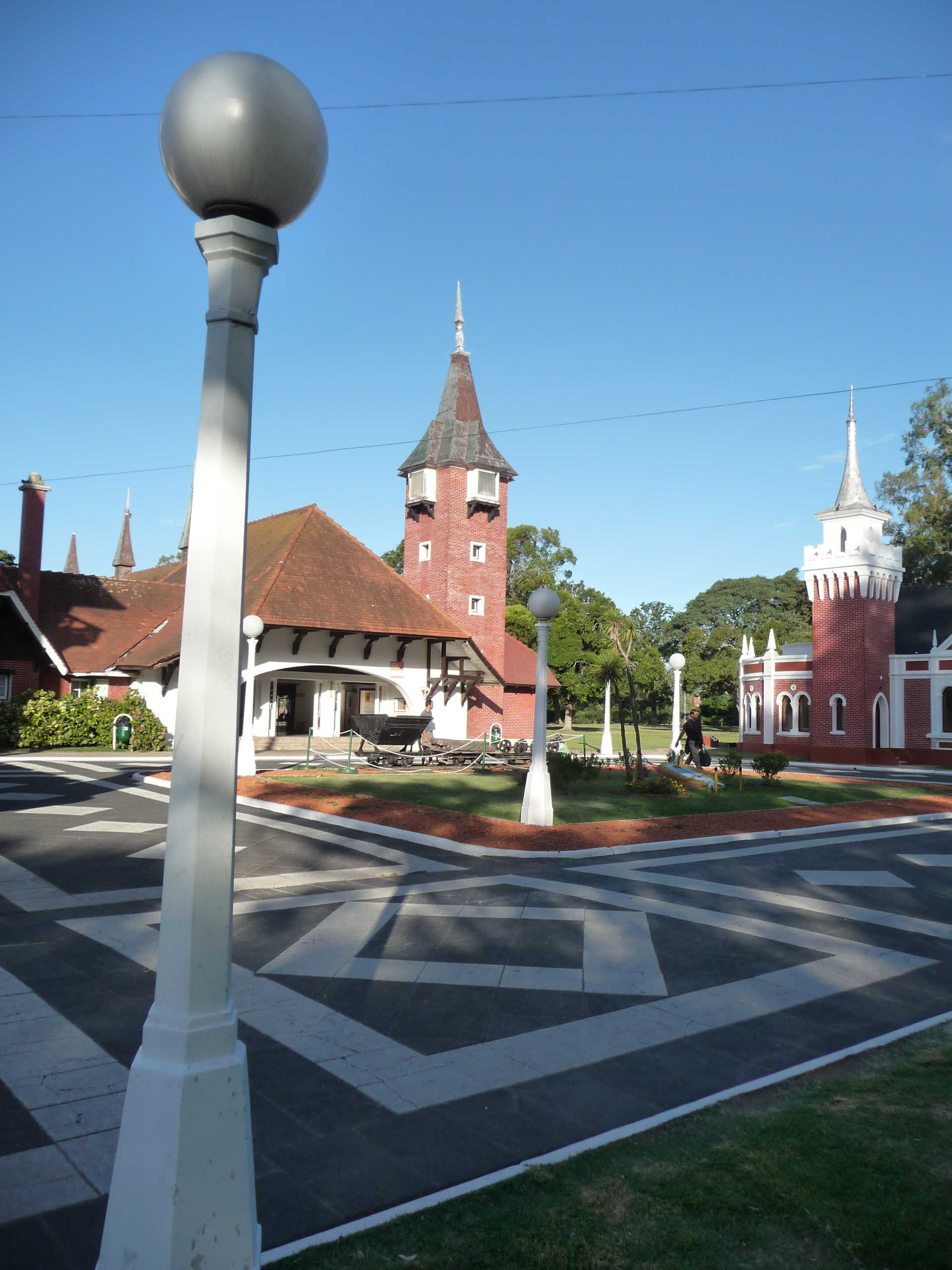
Main train station

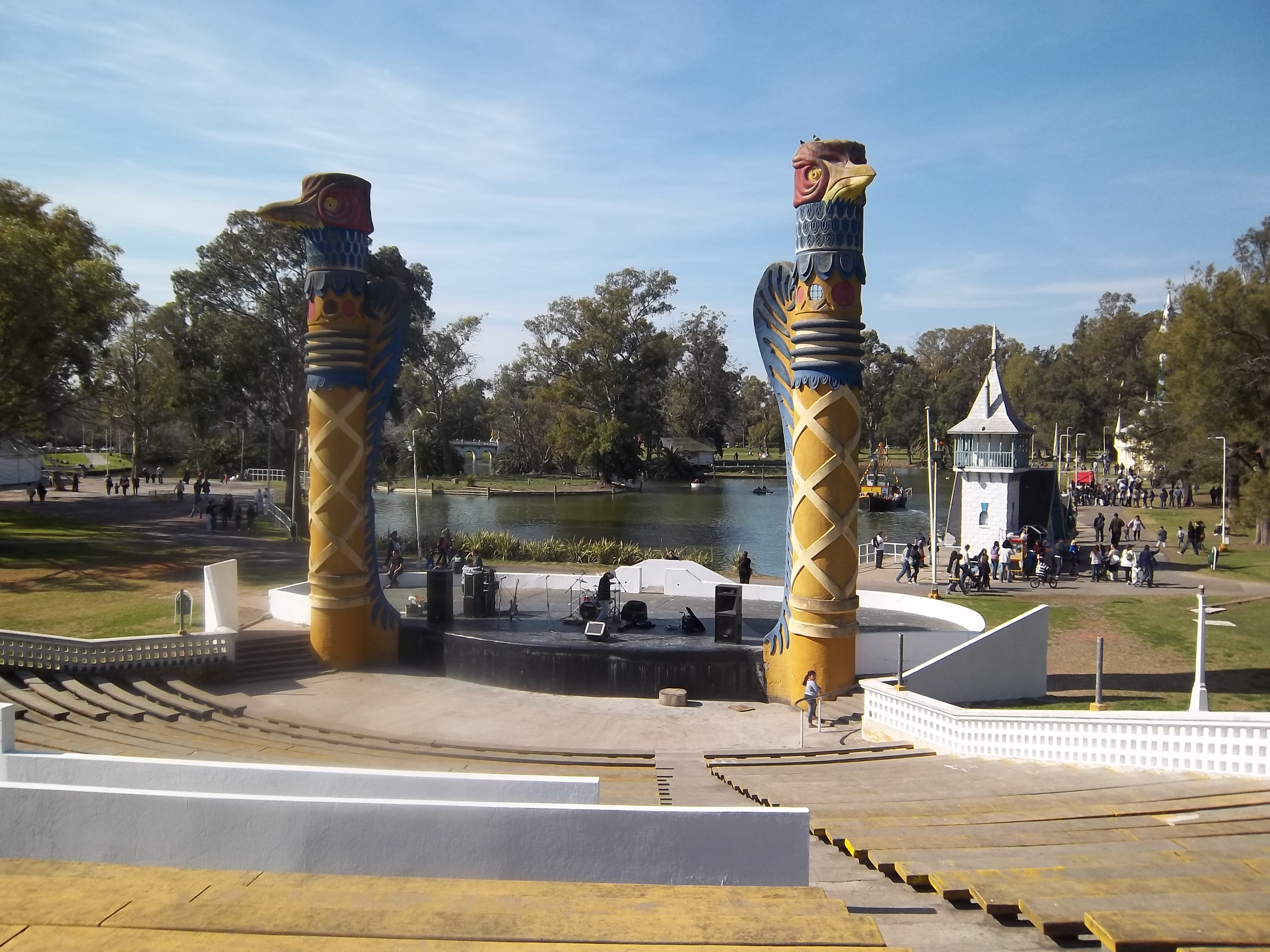
Amphitheatre
