= Battle of Ponta de Santiago =

1828 Cisplatine War naval battle

- Part of Cisplatine War
| Date | 15 January 1828 |
| Location | Ensenada de Barragán, Argentina 34°49′S 57°54′W |
| Result | Indecisive |

Belligerents
| Empire of Brazil | (Argentina) United Provinces |

Commanders and leaders
| James Norton | William Brown |

Strength
| 2 brigs 1 schooner Total guns: ~40 | 5 schooners Total guns: ~30 |

Casualties and losses
| 2 dead "some" wounded | 1 schooner damaged |

The Battle of Ponta de Santiago was a minor naval battle fought in January 1828 during the Cisplatine War. An Argentine flotilla, under Admiral William Brown, was intercepted by some Brazilian ships which were blockading Buenos Aires, but there were no ships sunk on either side before the Argentines managed to withdraw back to port.

== Background ==
In the night of 14 January 1828, Admiral William Brown, commander of the Argentine Navy during the Cisplatine War, ordered five schooners to run past the Brazilian fleet blockading Buenos Aires to escort another schooner, the Juncal, under César Fournier, which was going to the United States in order to acquire more ships for the United Provinces. By 7 AM of the next day, already having passed the Brazilians, Brown judged the Juncal to be safe, and it set off alone towards its goal. They then started to sail back to Buenos Aires.

== Engagement and aftermath ==
At 9 AM, the Brazilian blockade fleet was sighted, 16-ships strong; Brown had to withdraw to the southeast. In the afternoon, he tried to make for the Barragán cove, some 40 kilometres (25 mi) southeast of Buenos Aires, but was intercepted by a force of 2 brigs and 1 schooner which outgunned his force. Though the fleets fought from 16PM to sunset, no ships were sunk or seriously damaged, except for the Argentine schooner 8 de Febrero, which lost one of its masts. Given this, and the impending arrival of the main Brazilian blockading fleet, the Argentines withdrew to the shallow sandbanks near Monte Santiago, something which, together with the darkness of the night, kept the Brazilians from pursuing them.
