= Los Hornos =

- Town
- Location in Buenos Aires Province Los Hornos (Argentina)
- Coordinates: 34°57′S 57°58′W
- Country: Argentina
- Province: Buenos Aires
- Partido: La Plata
- Elevation: 6 m (20 ft)

Population (2001 census [INDEC])
  - Total: 54,406
- CPA Base: B 1900
- Area code: +54 221

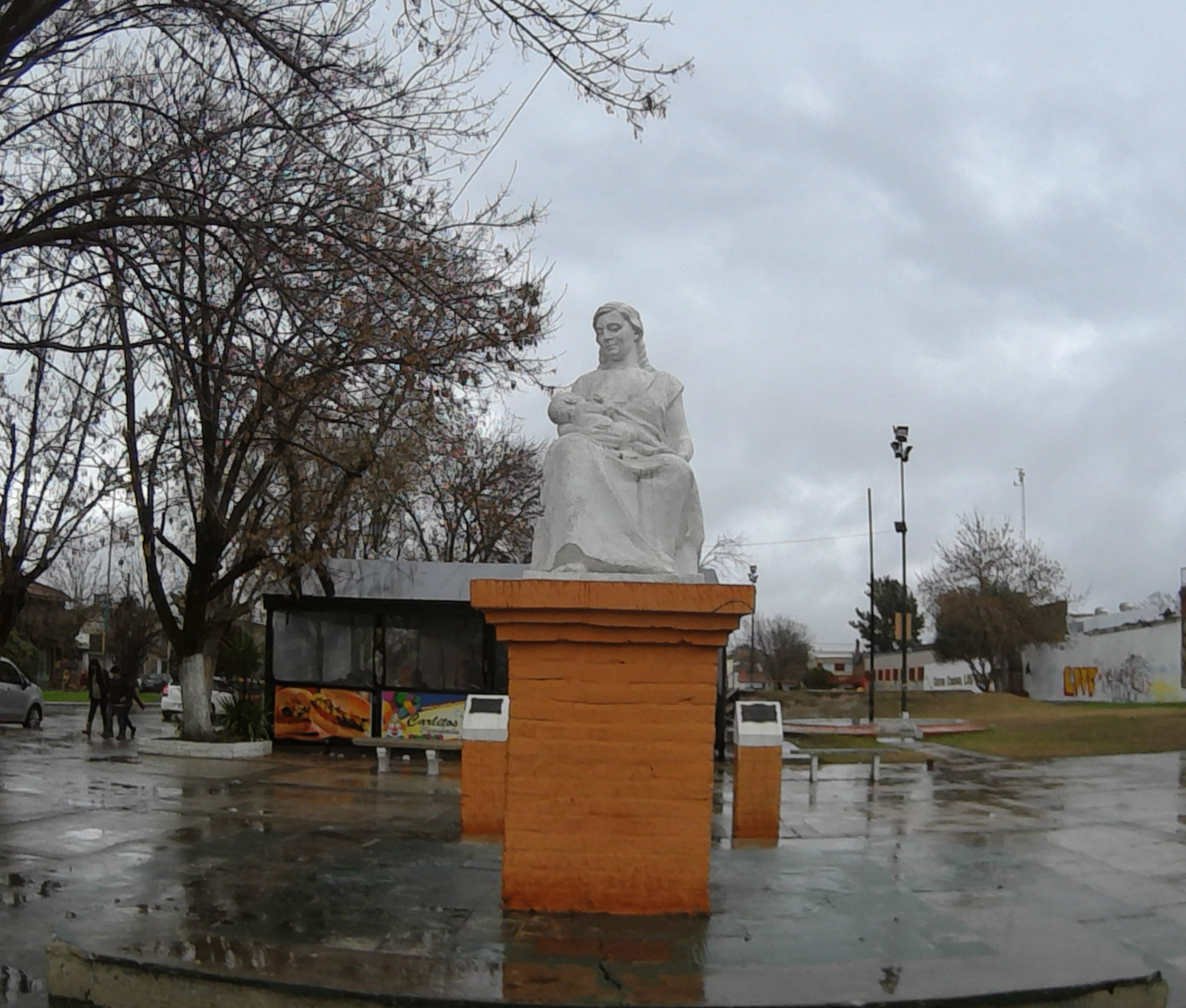

Los Hornos is a town in La Plata, Buenos Aires, Argentina.

Los Hornos belongs to the Greater La Plata urban conglomerate. Its name, (Spanish for "the [brick] ovens" or "the furnaces"), refers to the several brick factories that were located in the area at the end of the 19th century, and which supplied the bricks for many of the buildings in the nascent city of La Plata. The area was heavily settled by Italian immigrants, and became renowned for its many family orchards.

In Los Hornos one can find a cemetery and the St. Benjamin parish.
