= City Bell =

- Town
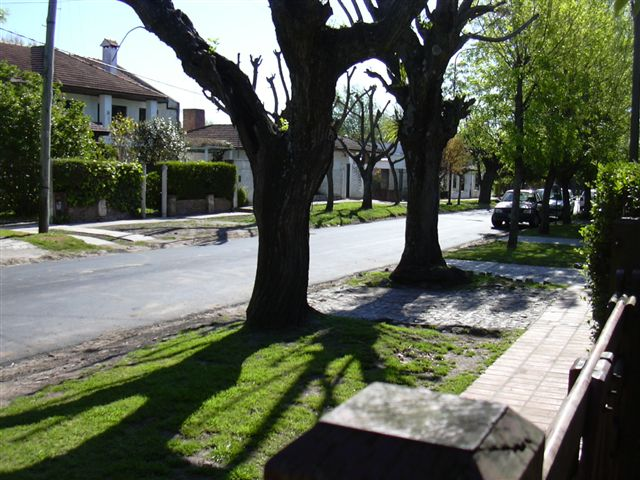

- Location in Buenos Aires Province City Bell (Argentina)
- Coordinates: 34°51′S 58°03′W
- Country: Argentina
- Province: Buenos Aires
- Partido: La Plata
- Founded: May 10, 1914
- Elevation: 6 m (20 ft)

Population (2001 census [INDEC])
  - Total: 32,646
- CPA Base: B 1896
- Area code: +54 221

City Bell is a town located in La Plata Partido, Buenos Aires, Argentina. It is located some 10 kilometers from the city center. It forms part of the Greater La Plata urban agglomeration.

The earliest settlement in City Bell was founded around 1900 by English immigrants led by George Bell. On July 18, 1913, Bell's heirs sold approximately 3 km² (1.1 mi²) to Sociedad Anónima de City Bell for the purpose of reselling the land in lots in the hope of founding a new town. The town, named in honor of its founder, George Bell, was authorized by the Provincial Legislature on May 10, 1914, and the City Bell station of the Buenos Aires Great Southern Railway was completed that year. The planned community grew more slowly than planned, however, and much of the grounds were used to some extent for farming. Finally, a small group of people settled down, and as the town started to grow larger, amenities were developed such as the local electric utility (1922), and a new, larger train station (1925).

City Bell was chosen as the site of the Argentine Army's Communications Battalion 601 in 1944. Situated between Buenos Aires and La Plata along the former National Route 1 (Camino Centenario), its recreational facilities include the 200 ha (500 ac) Municipal Ecological Park, the City Bell Athletic Club (1926), which since the 1960s hosts the Regional Folklore Festival, the Teatro de Cámara, the City Bell Golf and Equestrian Clubs, the Gauguin Art Gallery (1984), and the City Bell Cultural Center (1997). The Bank of the Province of Buenos Aires also maintains its staff's athletic club here.

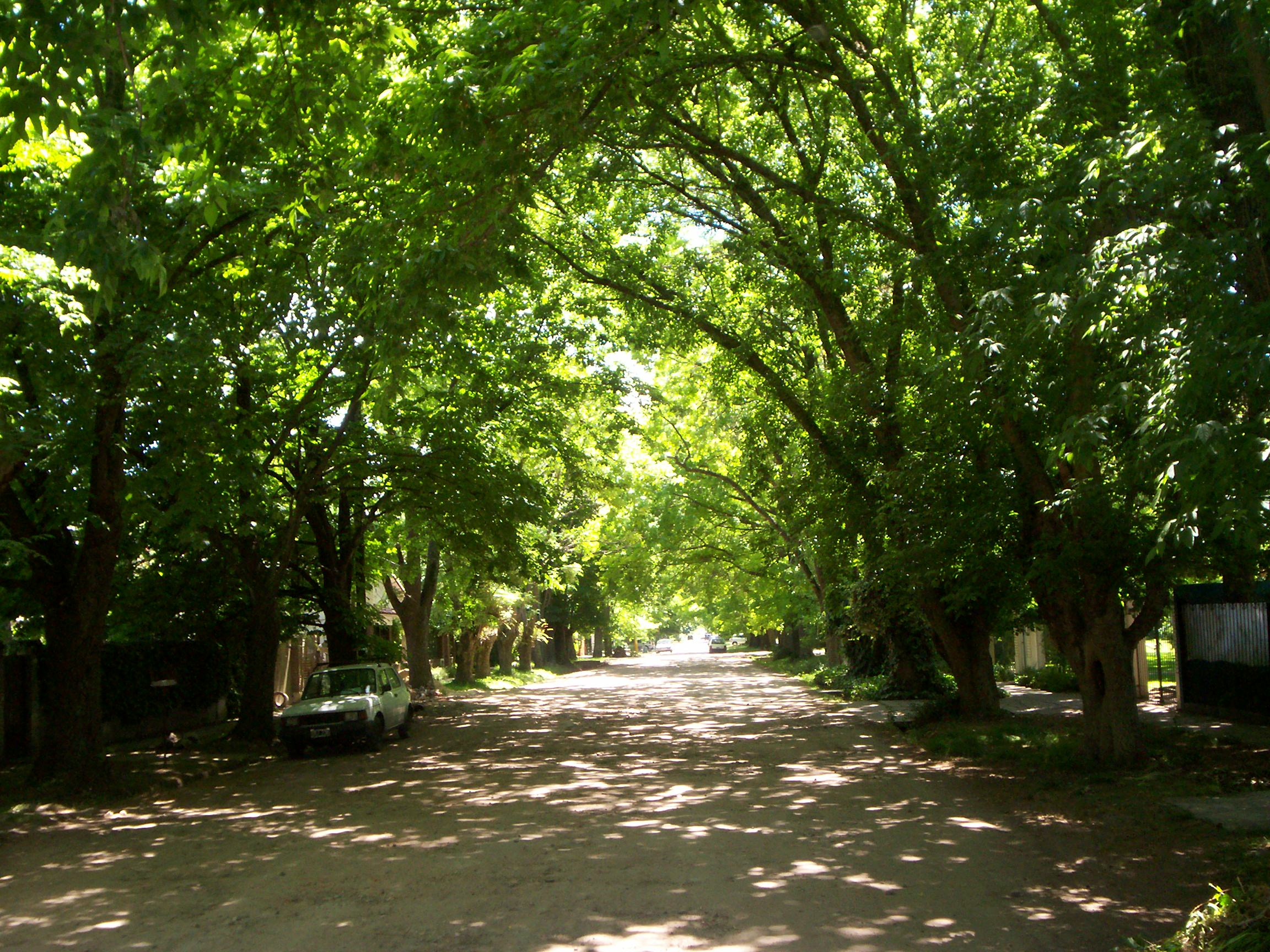
Tree lined street in City Bell
