= Villa Elvira =

- district
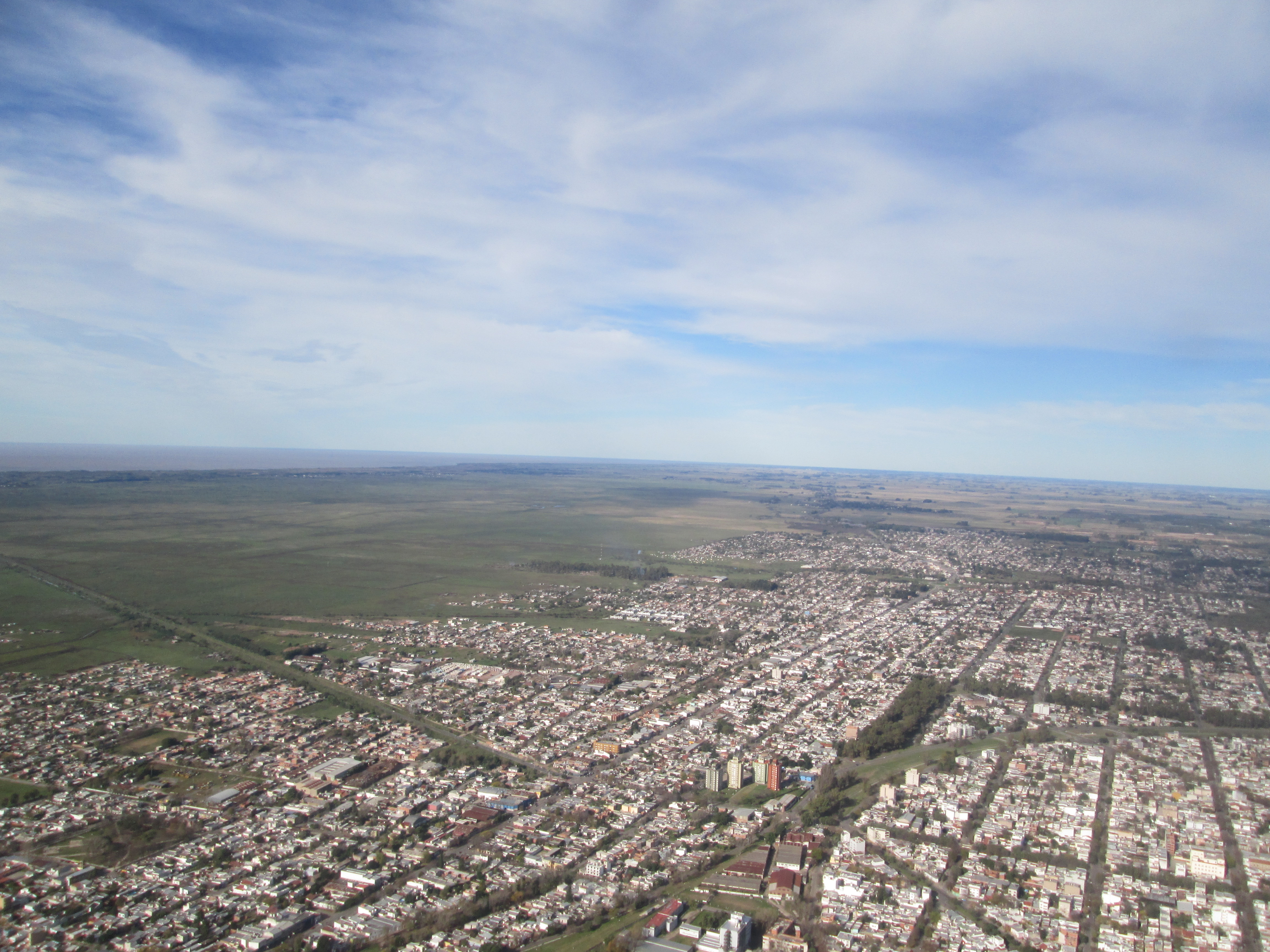
- Aerial photo of Berisso Partido, the eastern corner of La Plata City and Villa Elvira, in Buenos Aires Province, Argentina.

- Location within Argentina
- Coordinates: 34°55′59″S 57°54′47″W
- Country: Argentina
- Province: Buenos Aires
- Partido: La Plata
- Elevation: 20 m (66 ft)

Population (2020 estimate)
  - Total: 100,480
- Time zone: UTC−3 (ART)
- CPA Base: B 1901
- Climate: Dfc

Villa Elvira is a neighborhood in Argentina, dependent of the La Plata city located in the La Plata Partido of Buenos Aires Province.
