= Joaquín Gorina =

- Town
- Location within Argentina
- Coordinates: 34°54′29″S 58°2′25″W
- Country: Argentina
- Province: Buenos Aires
- Partido: La Plata
- Elevation: 21 m (69 ft)

Population (2001 Census)
  - Total: 5,521
- Time zone: UTC−3 (ART)
- CPA Base: B 1903
- Climate: Dfc

Joaquín Gorina is a town in Argentina, located in the La Plata Partido of Buenos Aires Province.
