= Ángel Etcheverry =

- Location in Argentina
- Coordinates: 35°1′38″S 58°4′19″W
- Country: Argentina
- Province: Buenos Aires
- Partido: La Plata
- Elevation: 28 m (92 ft)

Population (2001 census)
  - Total: 2,929
- CPA Base: B 1901
- Area code: +54 221

Ángel Etcheverry is a locality in La Plata Partido, in the Buenos Aires Province of Argentina . It is located 16 km southwest of the La Plata city center. It is connected to the city thanks to Provincial Route 215 and connected to Buenos Aires through Provincial Route 2.
