= Tolosa, Buenos Aires =

Tolosa
- Town
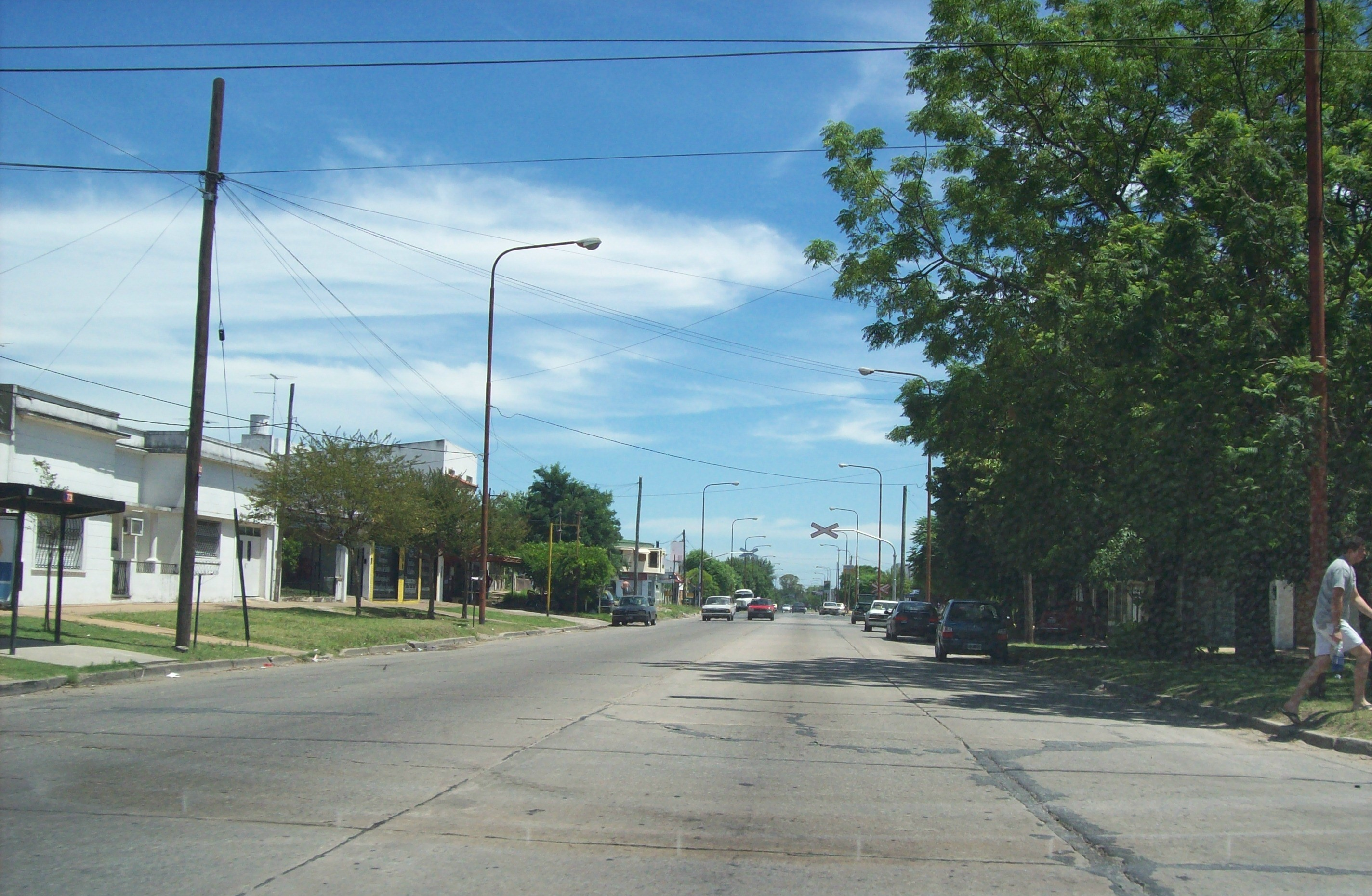
- Avenida 120 (Provincial Route 13) in Tolosa

- Location within Argentina
- Coordinates: 34°53′39″S 57°57′53″W
- Country: Argentina
- Province: Buenos Aires
- Partido: La Plata
- Established: 20 December 1871
- Elevation: 38 m (125 ft)

Population (2010 Census)
  - Total: 41,705
- Time zone: ART
- CPA Base: B 1900
- Climate: Dfc

Tolosa is a town located in the La Plata Partido of Buenos Aires Province, Argentina. It is part of the Greater La Plata metropolitan area.

Tolosa is the birthplace of former President Cristina Fernández de Kirchner. Another notable resident is Juan Pablo Belatti, a FIFA football assistant referee who is the most active assistant referee in FIFA World Cup tournaments.
