= Berisso Partido =

Berisso Partido de Berisso
- Department
- Location of Berisso in Buenos Aires Province
- Coordinates: 34°53′S 57°54′W
- Country: Argentina
- Established: April 3, 1957
- Founder: Provincial law 2959
- Seat: Berisso

Government
  - Intendant: Fabián Cagliardi (PJ)

Area
  - Total: 135 km^{2} (52 sq mi)

Population
  - Total: 80,092
  - Density: 593/km^{2} (1,540/sq mi)
- Demonym: berisense
- Postal Code: B1923
- IFAM: BUE014
- Area Code: 0221
- Website: www.berisso.gov.ar

Partidos of Gran Buenos Aires and Gran La Plata

Berisso Partido is a small eastern partido of Buenos Aires Province in Argentina.

The provincial subdivision has a population of 80,092 inhabitants in an area of 135 km^{2} (52 sq mi), and its capital city is Berisso, which is around 57 km (35 mi) from Buenos Aires.

The district forms part of the historical territory of Gran La Plata, to the south of Buenos Aires.

Berisso is home to Club Atlético Villa San Carlos, a football club who currently play in the regionalised 3rd division of Argentine football.

== Settlements ==
- Berisso
- Barrio Banco Provincia
- Barrio El Carmen
- Barrio Universitario
- Los Catorce
- Palo Blanco
- Paraje Los Talas
- Villa Argüello
- Villa Banco Constructor
- Villa Dolores
- Villa Independencia
- Villa Nueva
- Villa Porteña
- Villa Progreso
- Villa San Carlos
- Villa Zula
