= Abasto, La Plata =

Abasto
- Town
- Location within Argentina
- Coordinates: 34°59′13″S 58°5′20″W
- Country: Argentina
- Province: Buenos Aires
- Partido: La Plata
- Elevation: 29 m (95 ft)

Population (2001 Census)
  - Total: 6,799
- Time zone: UTC−3 (ART)
- CPA Base: B 1903
- Climate: Dfc

Abasto is a town in Argentina, located in the La Plata Partido of Buenos Aires Province.
