= Villa Elisa, Buenos Aires =

Villa Elisa
- Town
- Location within Argentina
- Coordinates: 34°51′12″S 58°4′45″W
- Country: Argentina
- Province: Buenos Aires
- Partido: La Plata
- Elevation: 14 m (46 ft)

Population (2001 Census)
  - Total: 19,643
- Time zone: UTC−3 (ART)
- CPA Base: B 1894
- Climate: Dfc

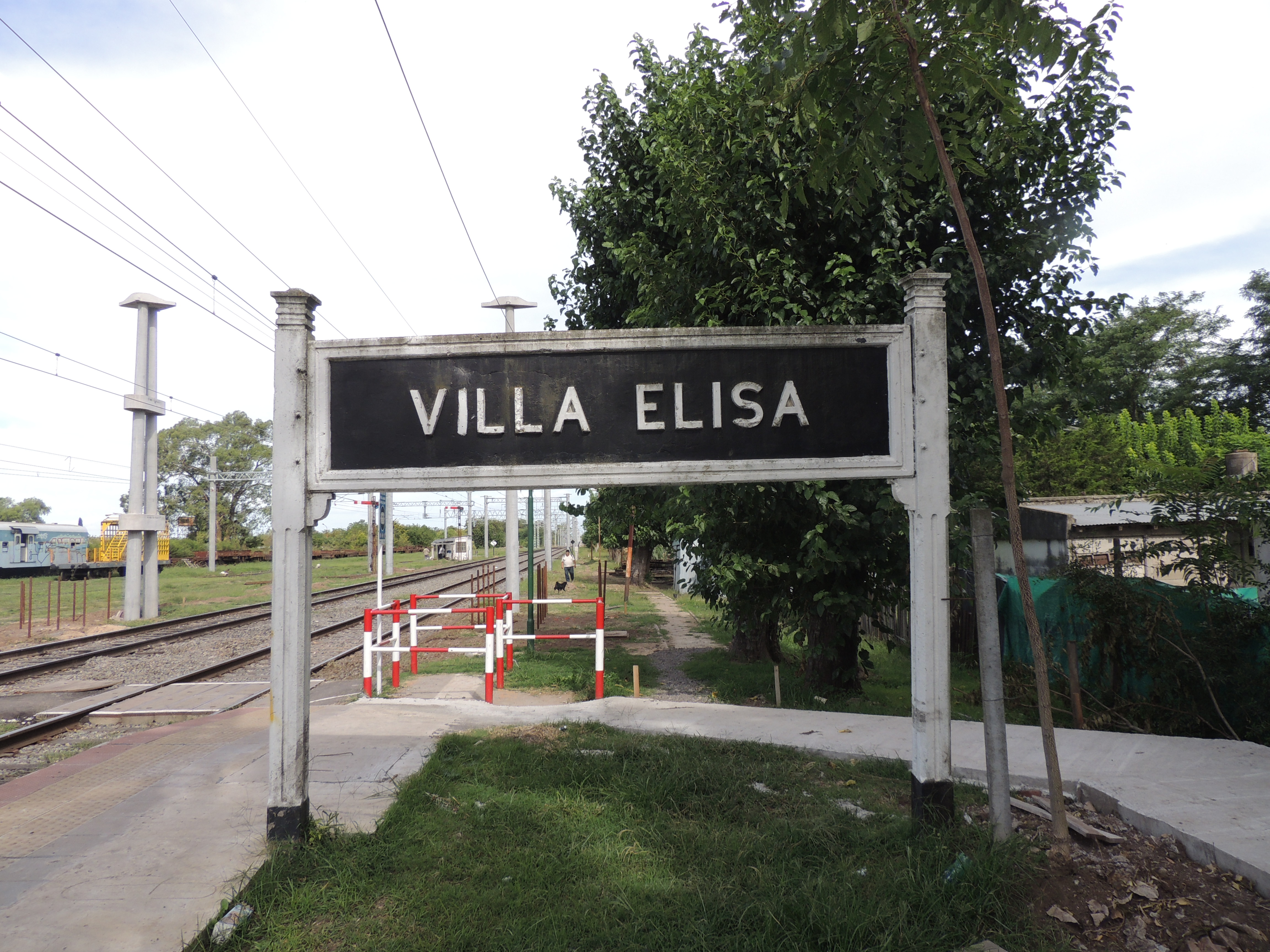
Villa Elisa train station, Roca line.

Villa Elisa is a town in Argentina, located in the La Plata Partido of Buenos Aires Province.
