= Lisandro Olmos =

- Town
- Location within Argentina
- Coordinates: 34°59′43″S 58°2′53″W
- Country: Argentina
- Province: Buenos Aires
- Partido: La Plata
- Elevation: 29 m (95 ft)

Population (2001 Census)
  - Total: 17,842
- Time zone: UTC−3 (ART)
- CPA Base: B 1901
- Climate: Dfc

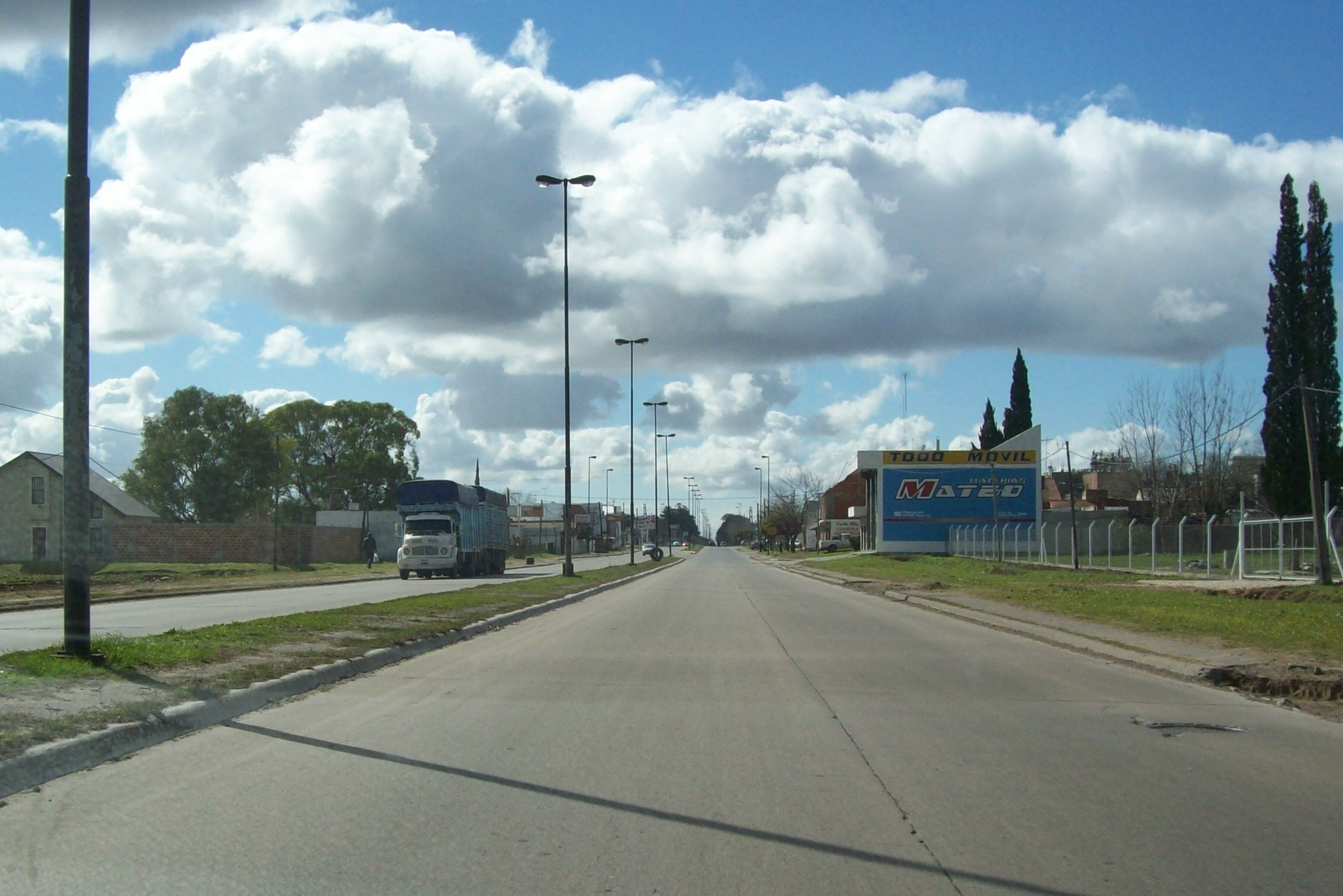
Provincial Route 215 in Lisandro Olmos, La Plata Partido, Buenos Aires, Argentina.

Lisandro Olmos is a town in Argentina, located in the La Plata Partido of Buenos Aires Province.
