= Ensenada Partido =

Ensenada Partido de Ensenada
- Department
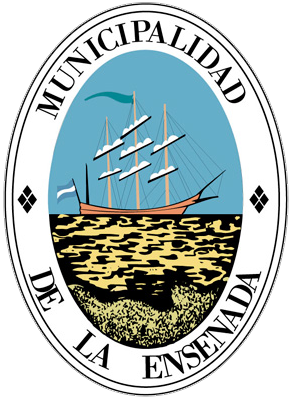
- Flag Coat of arms

- location of Ensenada Partido in Gran Buenos Aires
- Coordinates: 34°52′S 57°54′W
- Country: Argentina
- Seat: Ensenada

Government
  - Intendant: Mario Carlos Secco (Broad Front)

Area
  - Total: 135 km^{2} (52 sq mi)

Population
  - Total: 51,448
  - Density: 381/km^{2} (987/sq mi)
- Demonym: ensenadense
- Postal Code: B1925
- IFAM: BUE035
- Area Code: 02221
- Website: ensenada.gov.ar

Ensenada Partido (Spanish pronunciation: [enseˈnaða]) is a district (a "partido") of Buenos Aires Province, Argentina, belonging to the Greater La Plata area, just south of the Gran Buenos Aires urban conglomerate.

The provincial district has a population of about 51,448 inhabitants in an area of only 135 km^{2} (52 sq mi); its capital city is Ensenada, 27 km (17 mi) from Buenos Aires and 5 km (3.1 mi) from La Plata.

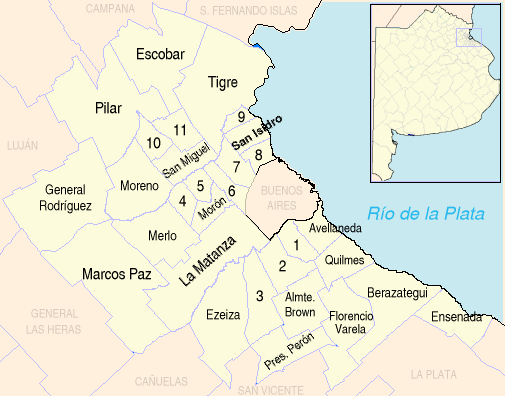
Barrios of Buenos Aires urban area

== History ==
The district spans the area historically known as Ensenada de Barragán (Barragán's Cove). The old coastal site forms part of what is today Santiago Island. A military battery and defensive wall was built there in the early 18th century, known as Fuerte Barragán (Fort Barragán). On 5 May 1801 Viceroy Marqués de Avilés founded the village of Ensenada. In 1882, the government of Dardo Rocha declared it as temporary provincial capital while the new city of La Plata was being built.

== Settlements ==
- Ensenada
- Punta Lara
- Villa Catella
- Dique Nº 1
- Isla Santiago
