= Ringuelet, Buenos Aires =

Ringuelet
- Town
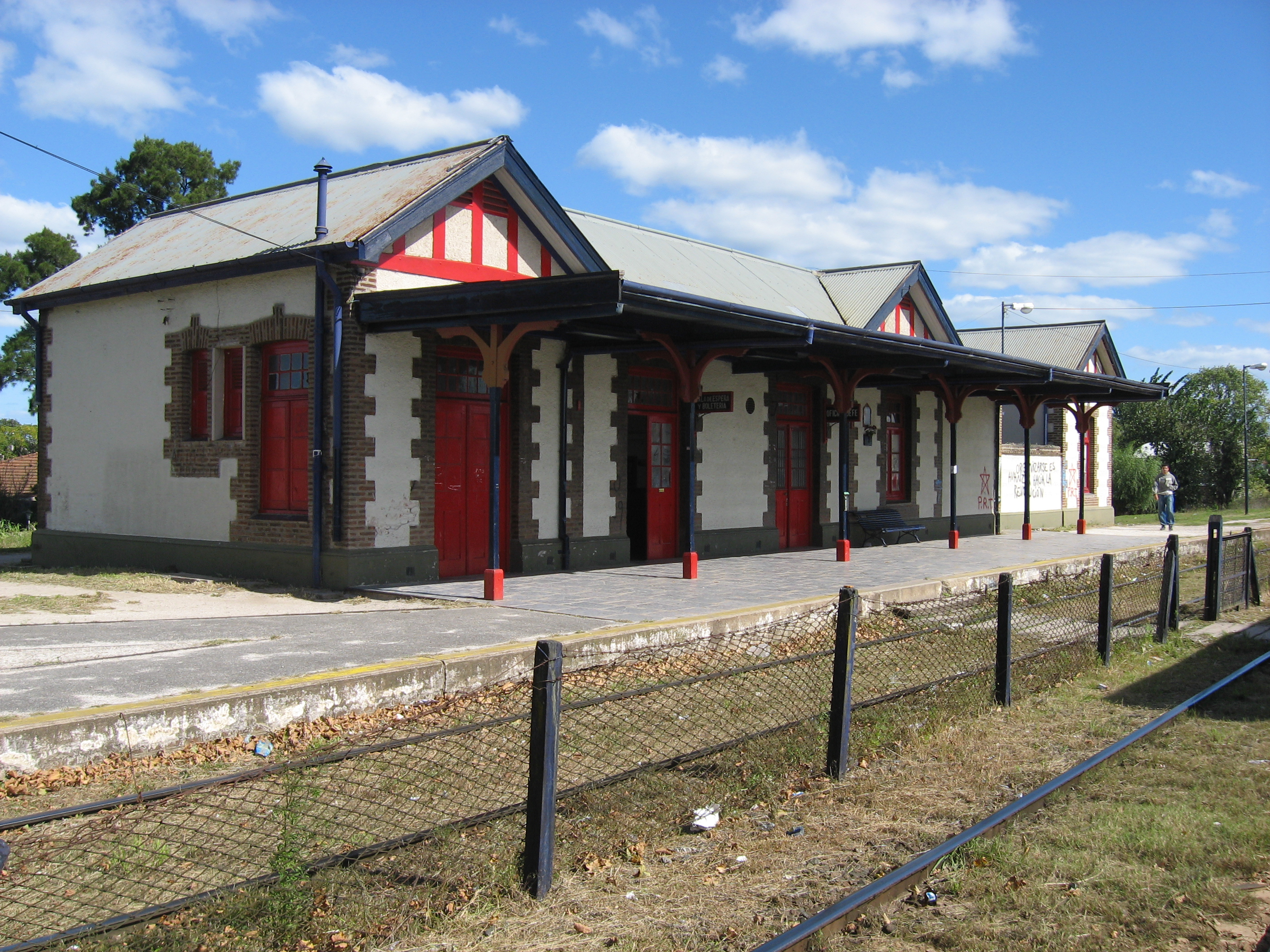

- Location within Argentina
- Coordinates: 34°53′16″S 57°59′9″W
- Country: Argentina
- Province: Buenos Aires
- Partido: La Plata
- Elevation: 6 m (20 ft)

Population (2001 Census)
  - Total: 13,473
- Time zone: UTC−3 (ART)
- CPA Base: B 1901
- Climate: Dfc

Ringuelet is a town located in the La Plata Partido of Buenos Aires Province of Argentina.
