= Ensenada, Buenos Aires =

City in Buenos Aires Province, Argentina

Ensenada
- City
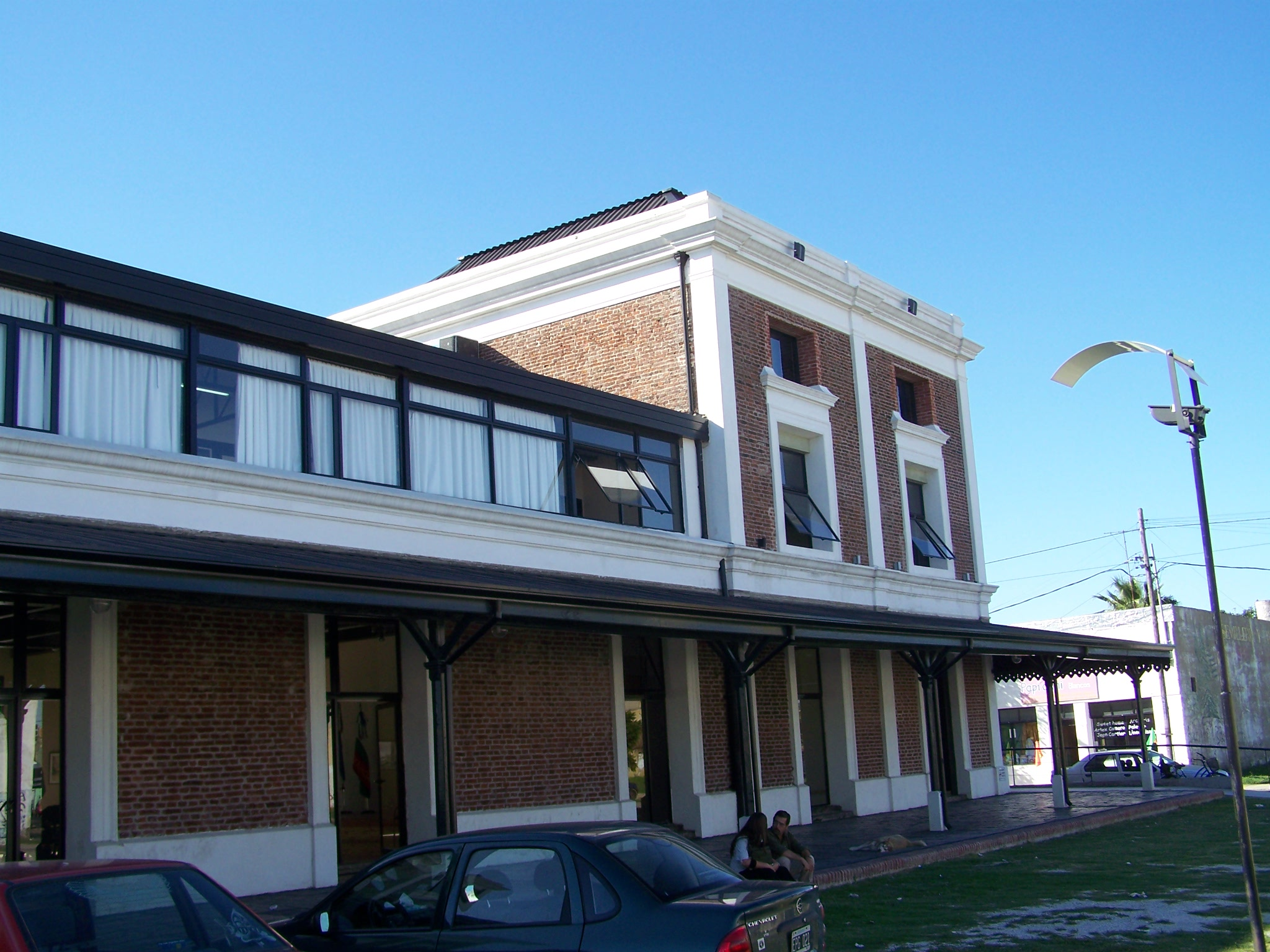
- City Cultural Center

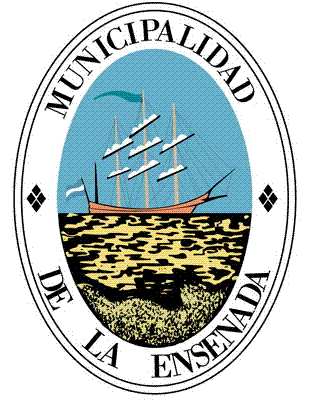
- Coat of arms

- Location in Argentina
- Coordinates: 34°51′52″S 57°54′37″W
- Country: Argentina
- Province: Buenos Aires
- Partido: Ensenada
- Founded: January 2, 1801
- Elevation: 4 m (13 ft)

Population (2010 census)
  - Total: 54,463
- CPA Base: B 1925
- Area code: +54 221

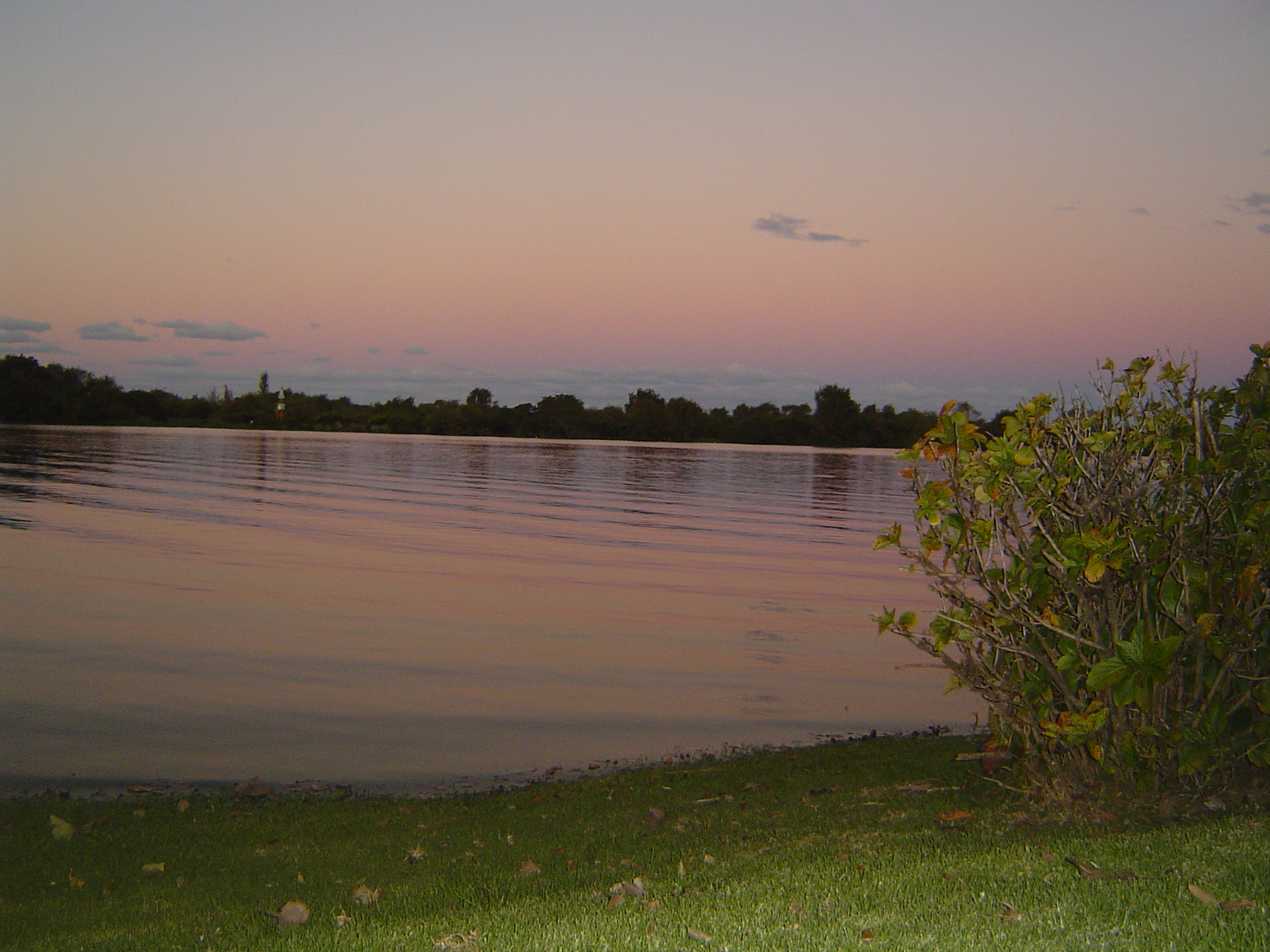
The Santiago River, an inlet along Ensenada.

Ensenada (Spanish pronunciation: [enseˈnaða]) is a city and port in Buenos Aires Province, Argentina, located around the Ensenada de Barragán. It has 31,031 inhabitants as per the 2001 census [INDEC]. It is the capital of Ensenada Partido, and together with Berisso Partido they are the main suburbs of the Gran La Plata conurbation around the provincial capital of La Plata.

The port of Ensenada carries grain and beef exports, as well as industrial shipments. The volume traded has been recently growing at the expense of the Buenos Aires port, located 60 km to the north-west.

As Buenos Aires city authorities are considering repurposing the port of Buenos Aires as a passenger-only facility, the volume at Ensenada (as well as that of the ports in Campana and Bahía Blanca) is slated to experience further growth.

== Geography ==
Ensenada is located 10 km (6.2 mi) from the provincial capital of La Plata.

== History ==
The region around Ensenada was first discovered by Europeans in 1520, during the voyage of Ferdinand Magellan. An estancia was established in the region in 1629 by Antonio Gutiérrez Barragán. Around the beginning of the 18th century the region was sold to the López Osornio family. A fort was constructed in the region in 1731, which would go on to resist a Portuguese invasion three years later. The fort would be destroyed by a flood in 1789.

A chapel was constructed in 1750, and the town's creation was formalized on January 2, 1801, after a storm had destroyed the Port of Buenos Aires. Ensenada was used as a defensive port during the British invasions of the River Plate. Ensenada was declared the partido seat in 1856. Courier service to the town of Magdalena began in 1859, and a rail line was approved for creation in 1863. In the 20th century, the port was expanded with the inauguration of a hospital, a shipyard and a bridge. Fort Barragán, located within the town, was designated a National Historical Monument in 1942. In 1957, Ensenada became an autonomous city, separating from the city of La Plata.

== Population ==
According to INDEC, which collects population data for the country, the town had a population of 51,322 people as of the 2001 census.
