= Berisso =

City in Buenos Aires Province, Argentina

- City
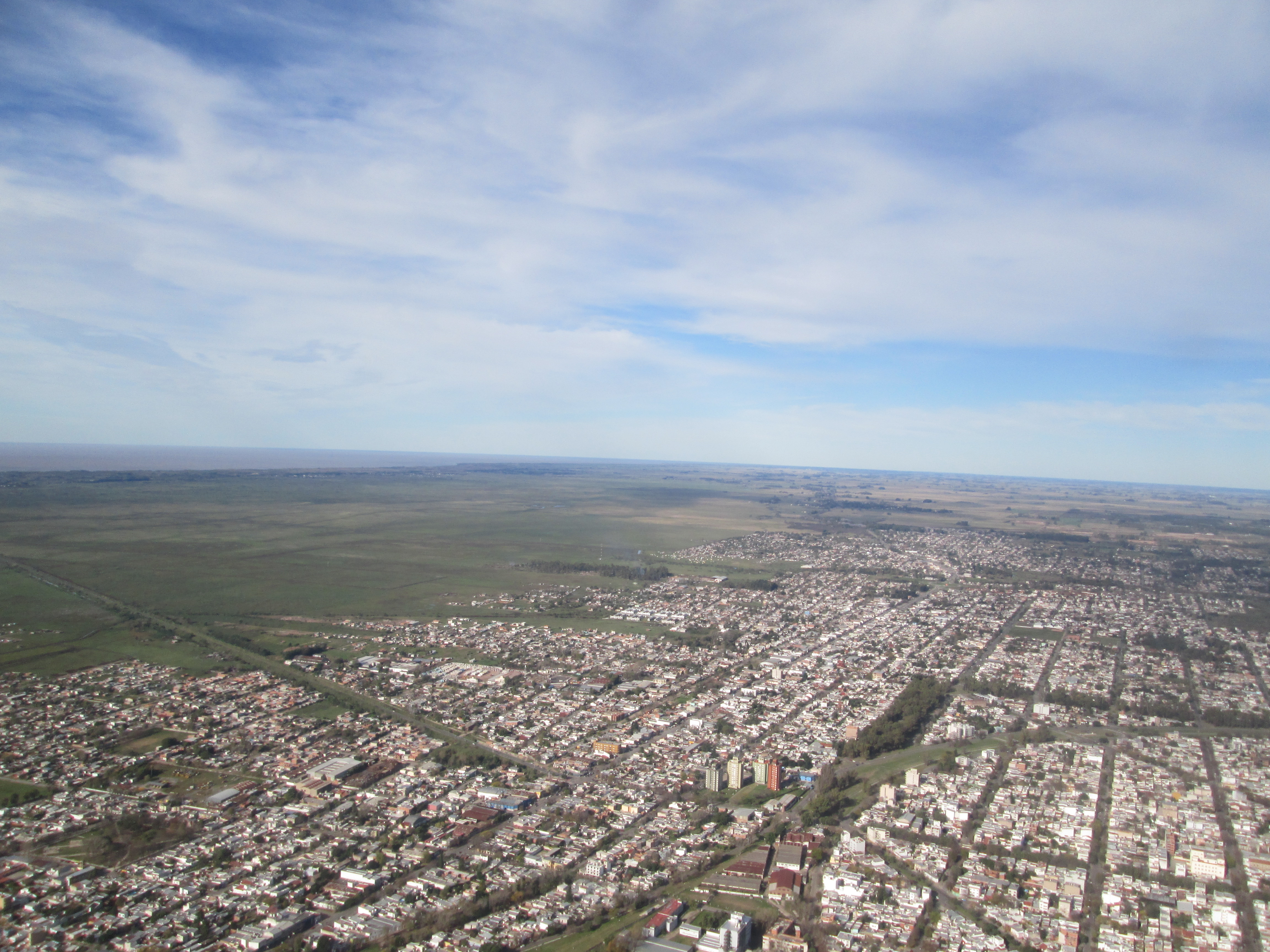

- Location in relation to Buenos Aires Province Berisso (Argentina)
- Coordinates: 34°52′22″S 57°53′09″W
- Country: Argentina
- Province: Buenos Aires
- Partido: Berisso
- Founded: 1871
- Elevation: 6 m (20 ft)

Population (2010 census)
  - Total: 88,470
- CPA Base: B 1923
- Area code: +54 221
- Climate: Cfa

Berisso is a city and the head town of the partido of Berisso in Buenos Aires Province, Argentina. It forms part of the Greater La Plata urban area and has a population of approximately 88,470 as of 2010.

== People ==
Berisso was founded by Albanian immigrants, and settled by Albanians and other European immigrants. The founder of the city, Juan Berisso (Albanian: Gjon Berisha), was an arbëresh-albanian immigrant from Italy and he named the city after him, Berisha. The name changed into Berisso for a better pronunciation. Most Berissenses (name referring to the people of Berisso) are of Albanian, Ukrainian, or Polish descent, but include those of Spanish, German, Portuguese, Italian, Arab, Bulgarian, Croatian, Serbian, Armenian, Slovak, Irish, Lithuanian, Jewish and Greek descent.

Because it is home to many ethnicities, Berisso is known as "The Provincial Capital of the Immigrant." Berisso's diversity is celebrated on September with their own "Immigrant's Festival."
