= Punta Lara =

- City
- Location in Argentina Punta Lara (Argentina)
- Coordinates: 34°47′29″S 57°59′48″W
- Country: Argentina
- Province: Buenos Aires
- Partido: Ensenada
- Founded: 1826
- Elevation: 4 m (13 ft)

Population (2001 census [INDEC])
  - Total: 8,410
- CPA Base: B 1931
- Area code: +54 2221

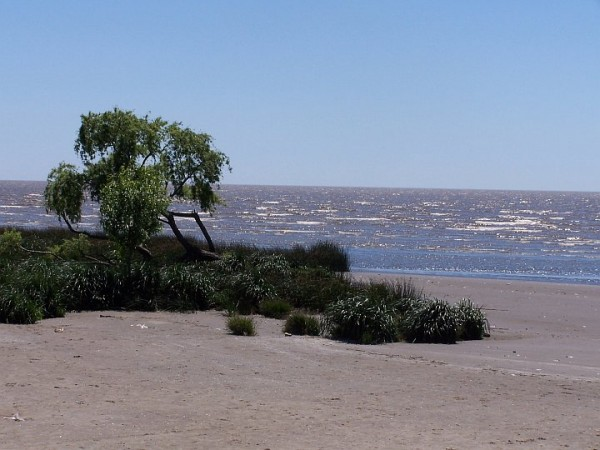
Beach of Punta Lara

Punta Lara is a city located in the Ensenada Partido, in Buenos Aires Province, Argentina.

== See also ==
- Battle of Punta Lara
