= La Plata Partido =

La Plata Partido de La Plata
- Department
- Coat of arms

- location of La Plata Partido in Buenos Aires Province
- Coordinates: 34°55′S 57°17′W
- Country: Argentina
- Established: November 19, 1882
- Founder: Dardo Rocha
- Seat: La Plata

Government
  - Intendant: Julio Alak (PJ-UP)

Area
  - Total: 926 km^{2} (358 sq mi)

Population
  - Total: 654,324
  - Density: 707/km^{2} (1,830/sq mi)
- Demonym: Platense
- Postal Code: B1900
- Area Code: 0221
- Website: laplata.gob.ar

La Plata is a partido in Buenos Aires Province, Argentina, some 60 kilometres (37 mi) southeast of the city of Buenos Aires.

It has an area of 926 km^{2} (358 sq mi), and a population of 654,324 (2010 census [INDEC]). Its capital is La Plata, which also serves as the capital of the province. La Plata is the centre of the Greater La Plata urban conurbation.

Many of the suburbs have train links to both Buenos Aires and La Plata, and also good road access via the Buenos Aires-La Plata toll highway. There is also an extensive network of buses serving the Greater La Plata area.

The city of Manuel B. Gonnet features the República de los Niños theme park.

Several parks lie along the Camino General Belgrano road, which crosses the partido north-to-south, notably the Parque Pereyra Iraola.

== Education ==
The city has a good number of educational institutions at various levels, both public and private. The most renowned public schools are three of the four members of the UNLP: the Colegio Nacional Rafael Hernández, the Liceo Víctor Mercante and the Bachillerato de Bellas Artes.

La Plata is a symbol of a distinguished academy.

Statistics
Educational Institutions
Educational Level	Total	State	Private
Nivel Inicial	184	82	102
Nivel Primario	171	96	75
Nivel Medio	102	48	54
Nivel Terciario o Superior no Universitario	42	9	33
Students enrolled
Educational Level	Total	State	Private
Nivel Inicial	29.111	14.791	14.320
Nivel Primario	93.575	58.825	34.750
Nivel Medio	29.884	21.243	8.641
Nivel Terciario o Superior no Universitario	12.162	4.597	7.565

== Sports ==
La Plata is home to one of the fiercest derby matches (clásicos) in Argentine football, contested between Estudiantes and Gimnasia y Esgrima.

== Settlements ==
According to the definitions provided by INDEC, these are the localities and neighborhoods that are located inside of La Plata Partido.

=== Localities ===
- El Rodeo
- Ignacio Correas
- Lomas de Copello
- Ruta Sol

=== Entities ===
- Abasto
- Angel Etcheverry
- Arana
- Arturo Segui
- Barrio El Carmen (Oeste)
- Barrio Gambier
- Barrio Las Malvinas
- Barrio Las Quintas
- City Bell
- El Retiro
- Joaquín Gorina
- José Hernández
- José Melchor Romero
- La Cumbre
- La Plata (capital)
- Lisandro Olmos
- Los Hornos
- Manuel B. Gonnet
- Ringuelet
- Rufino de Elizalde
- Tolosa
- Transradio
- Villa Elisa
- Villa Elvira
- Villa Garibaldi
- Villa Montoro
- Villa Parque Sicardi

=== Parajes ===
Aside from the localities and neighborhoods recognized by INDEC, there are also a number of parajes (roughly translated to rest stops) inside La Plata Partido, which are defined by BAHRA (Base de Asentamientos Humanos de la República Argentina, or Database of Human Settlements of the Argentine Republic).

- Buchanan
- Esquina Negra
- La Providencia
- Martín García
- Poblet
