= Tranvía del Este =

Demonstration light rail line in Puerto Madero, Buenos Aires (2007–2012)

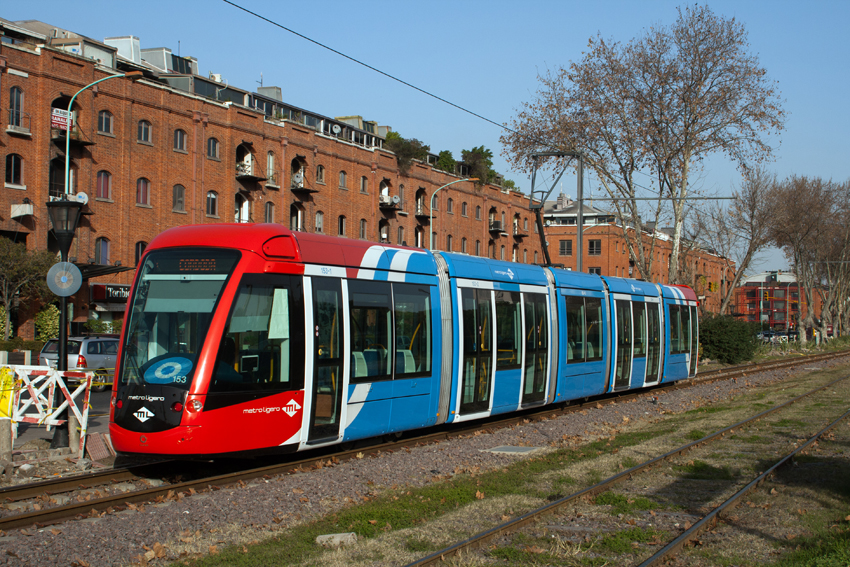
- Madrid tram in Puerto Madero in 2011

Overview
- Service type: Light rail
- Status: Inactive
- Locale: Buenos Aires
- First service: 14 July 2007
- Last service: October 10, 2012; 13 years ago
- Former operators: Alstom; Metrovías; Ferrovías
- Annual ridership: 102,000 (2012)

Route
- Termini: Córdoba; Independencia
- Stops: 4
- Distance travelled: 2 km (1.2 mi)
- Service frequency: 15 minutes

Technical
- Track gauge: 1,435 mm (4 ft 8 1/2 in) standard gauge
- Electrification: ? V DC Catenary
- Track owners: Government of Argentina (2007–12); SBASE (2012–present)

The Tranvía del Este, also known as the Puerto Madero Tramway, was a 12-block "demonstration" light rail line in the Puerto Madero neighborhood of Buenos Aires, Argentina, in operation from 2007 to 2012. It used French-built Alstom Citadis 302 trams on loan, initially from Mulhouse, France, and later from Madrid, Spain, and was jointly operated by Alstom, Metrovías, and Ferrovías.

After its initial demonstration status, numerous plans were put forward to extend the line and increase ridership, while incorporating it into the Buenos Aires Underground; however, none came to fruition. In March 2012, the Congress of Argentina promulgated a law which transferred Tranvía del Este to the city of Buenos Aires. Nevertheless, the city government refused to take over the service, leaving it inactive. In 2017, the stations were demolished in order to build the Paseo del Bajo.

== History ==
=== Background ===
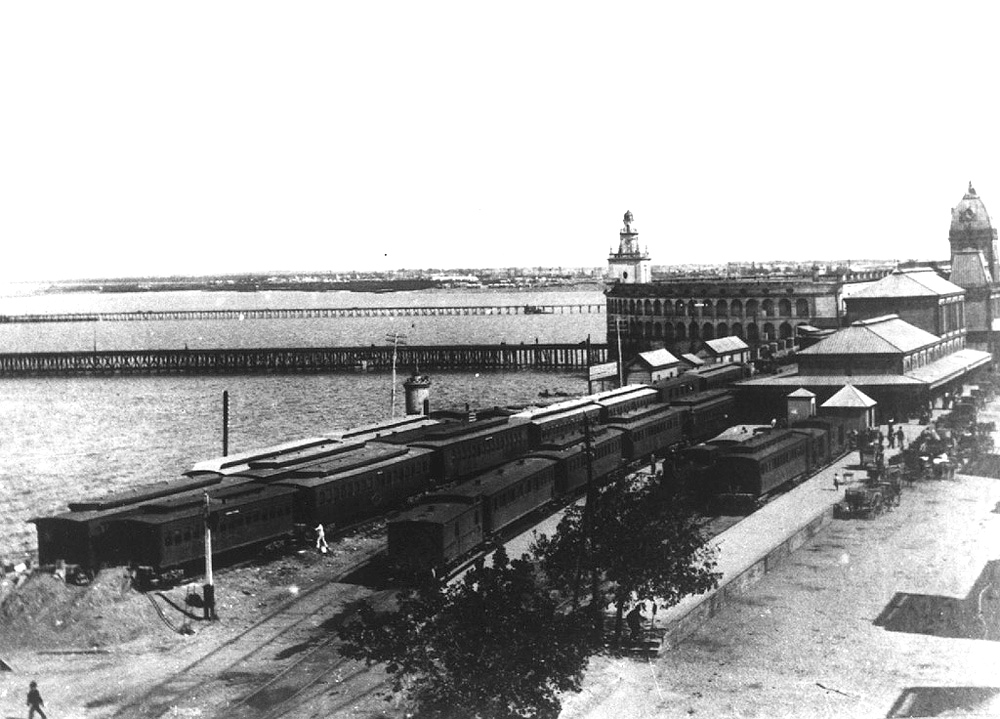
Estación Central de Buenos Aires and rail tracks c. 1875. The "Tren del Este" was an attempt to relaunch the route of the FCBA&E

Tranvía del Este ran on former Buenos Aires and Ensenada Port Railway tracks, that extended from the Central Station to Venezuela station, from there trains ran on a viaduct over Paseo de Julio Avenue to Casa Amarilla in La Boca, then continuing to Quilmes and Ensenada in Buenos Aires Province. After the Central Station was destroyed by fire (and demolished), Venezuela was set as terminus.

In May 2005, it was launched a project named "Tren del Este", which would be served by diesel railcars (similar to Premetro rolling stock) and operated by then-Belgrano Norte Line concessionary Ferrovías. Trains would depart from Aristóbulo del Valle station in Vicente López to Retiro, then running on the FCBA&E tracks to Avellaneda. Works planned included the construction of a third track to join del Valle and Retiro stations, and several intermediat stops such as "Aeroparque", located at the central hall of Aeroparque Jorge Newbery.

A total of 24 new stations would be built in an extension of 24 km. Rolling stock would be provided by Portuguese company Caminhos de Ferro Portugueses and included a total of 34 vehicles running on a track gauge of 1,000 mm (3 ft 3 3/8 in) at a maximum speed of 90 km/h. Nevertheless, that project was never carried out.

=== Operation ===
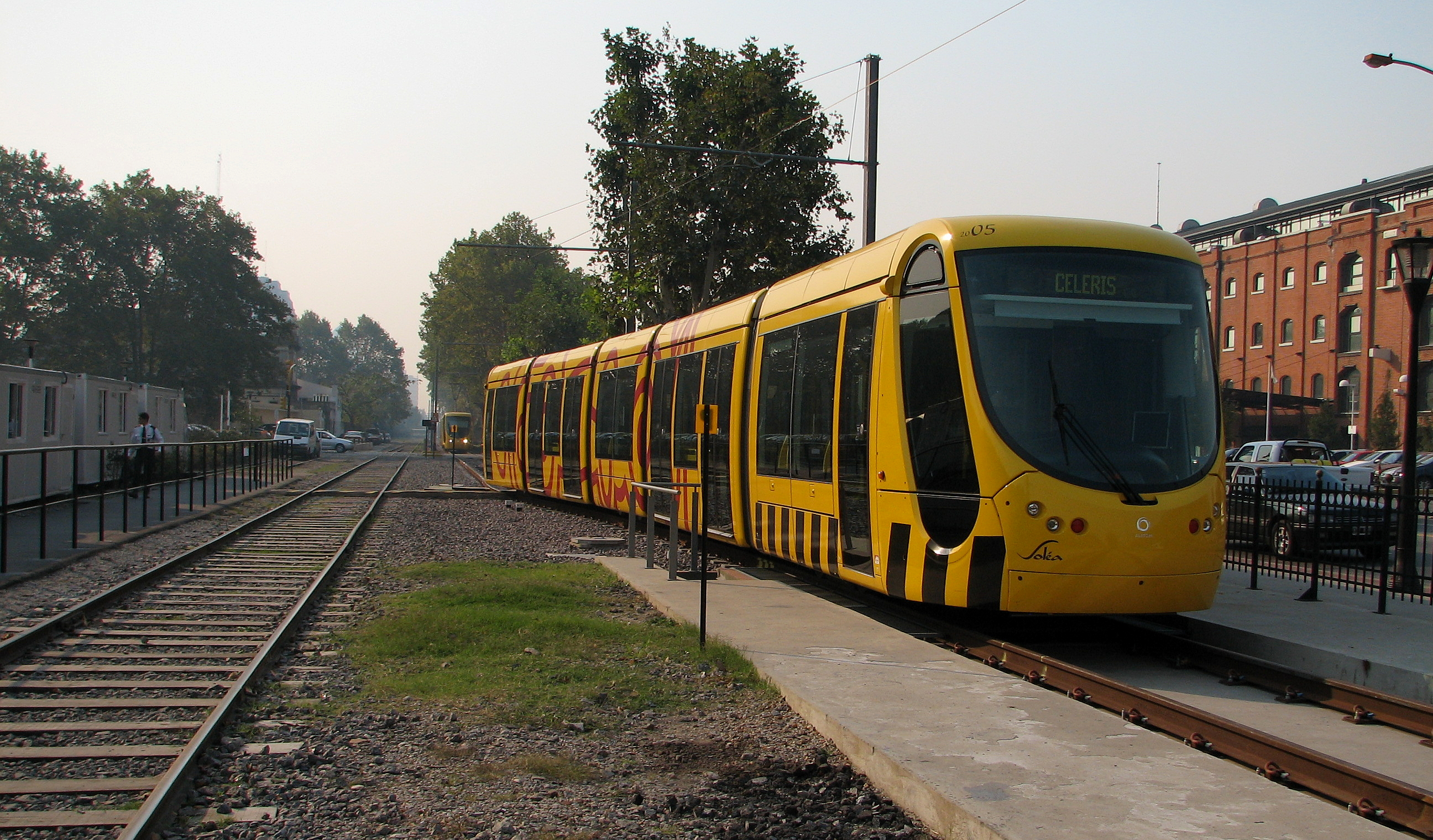
Celeris trams in front of Puerto Madero, with a freight track on the left

With construction of the first section completed, the line was inaugurated on July 14, 2007. Initially, the service was provided by two Alstom Citadis 302 model vehicles, manufactured by the French company Alstom, built for the Mulhouse tramway, in France, and temporarily loaned to Buenos Aires. Carrying Mulhouse numbers 04 and 05, the vehicles were double-ended, bi-directional, low-floor, four-section units, each section having 48 fixed seats, another 16 folding seats and standing room for a total of 300 passengers for the whole car. The vehicles, locally known by the name Celeris, ran on an exclusive right-of-way for 2 km (1.2 mi) parallel to Avenida Alicia Moreau de Justo, from Avenida Córdoba to Avenida Independencia.

After Mulhouse requested the return of the two trams it loaned, those cars left Buenos Aires in 2008. Replacing them on the Tranvía del Este was another tram of the same type, but loaned from Madrid, Spain, where it was number 153 (a number it also used in Buenos Aires) in the fleet of the Metro Ligero de Madrid light rail system.

The Mulhouse and Madrid trams both wore the paint schemes of their home systems while in Buenos Aires.

Trams ran from Monday through Saturday from 8:00 until 23:20, and on Sundays and holidays from 9:00 until 22:00, every 15 minutes. For tickets there were two Ticket Vending Machines (TVMs) installed at each station and guards with portable vending machines were also available. Tickets cost ARS 1.00 (around US$0.26).

Extensions were planned, of 2 km to Retiro railway station and the Intercity Bus Terminal and of 5.2 km from the then-existing terminus at Independencia to Caminito in La Boca. However, the extension plans did not proceed.

=== Closure ===
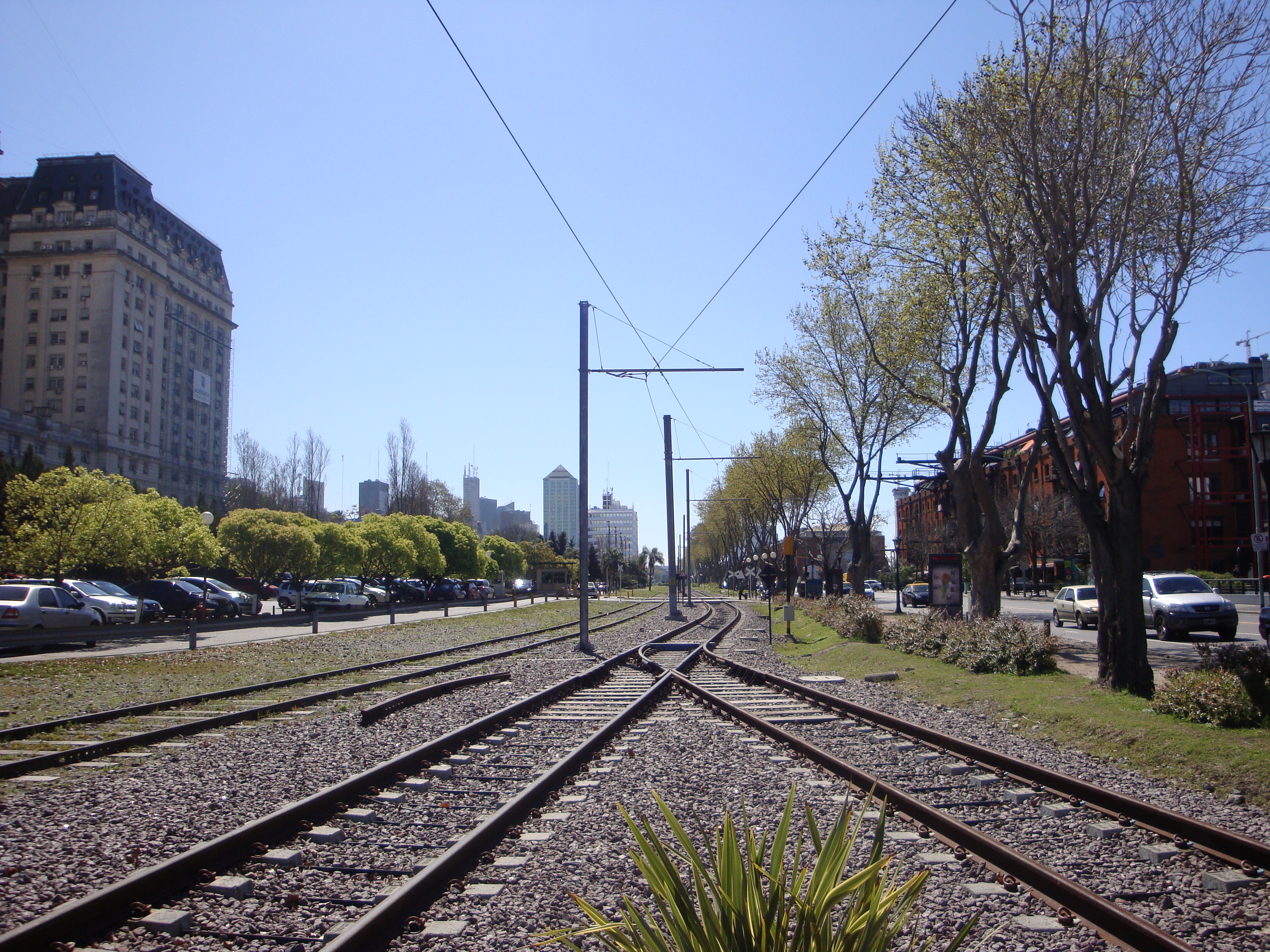
The line's infrastructure in 2009, before its closure. Tracks were later dismantled and incorporated into the Premetro.

By 2012, the scheduled headway was 40 minutes, using one car, and ridership on the line declined to a very low level. In October 2012, the line's only tramcar broke down, and service consequently had to be suspended indefinitely. It was decided to close the line, and 10 October 2012 was the last day of service.

In January 2013, the Government of Argentina transferred the Buenos Aires Underground lines to the Government of Buenos Aires autonomous city, including the Tranvía del Este among its services. In May 2013, the defective car still remained, abandoned, at Independencia station. After the transfer, the extension and expansion of the line was considered but it was not carried out.

The proposal made by State-owned company "Subterráneos de Buenos Aires" (SBASE) consisted of a series of improvements to the service that included the extension of the line to Retiro complex (connecting it with the three railway terminals and the homonymous Underground stations). The project also included the construction of a second track and the purchase of eight trains (at a cost of US$2 million).

Nevertheless, in July 2016, the Chief of Government of Buenos Aires, Horacio Rodriguez Larreta, announced that the disused Tranvía del Este components would be transferred to the Premetro, including its rolling stock (one tram), overhead lines and traffic signals. The reason given for dismantling of the line (along with freight tracks in its vicinity) was that its existence conflicted with a regeneration program over the line's entire trajectory, which would turn the right-of-way into parks as well as a partly-underground motorway for buses and heavy goods vehicles travelling between the north and south of the city.

=== Aftermath ===
In July 2017, the stations began to be demolished to build the "Paseo del Bajo", a 7-km length dual carriageway that connects the Presidente Illia and Buenos Aires–La Plata highways. Only heavy vehicles were allowed to run on Paseo del Bajo, which was inaugurated in 2019.

== Gallery ==
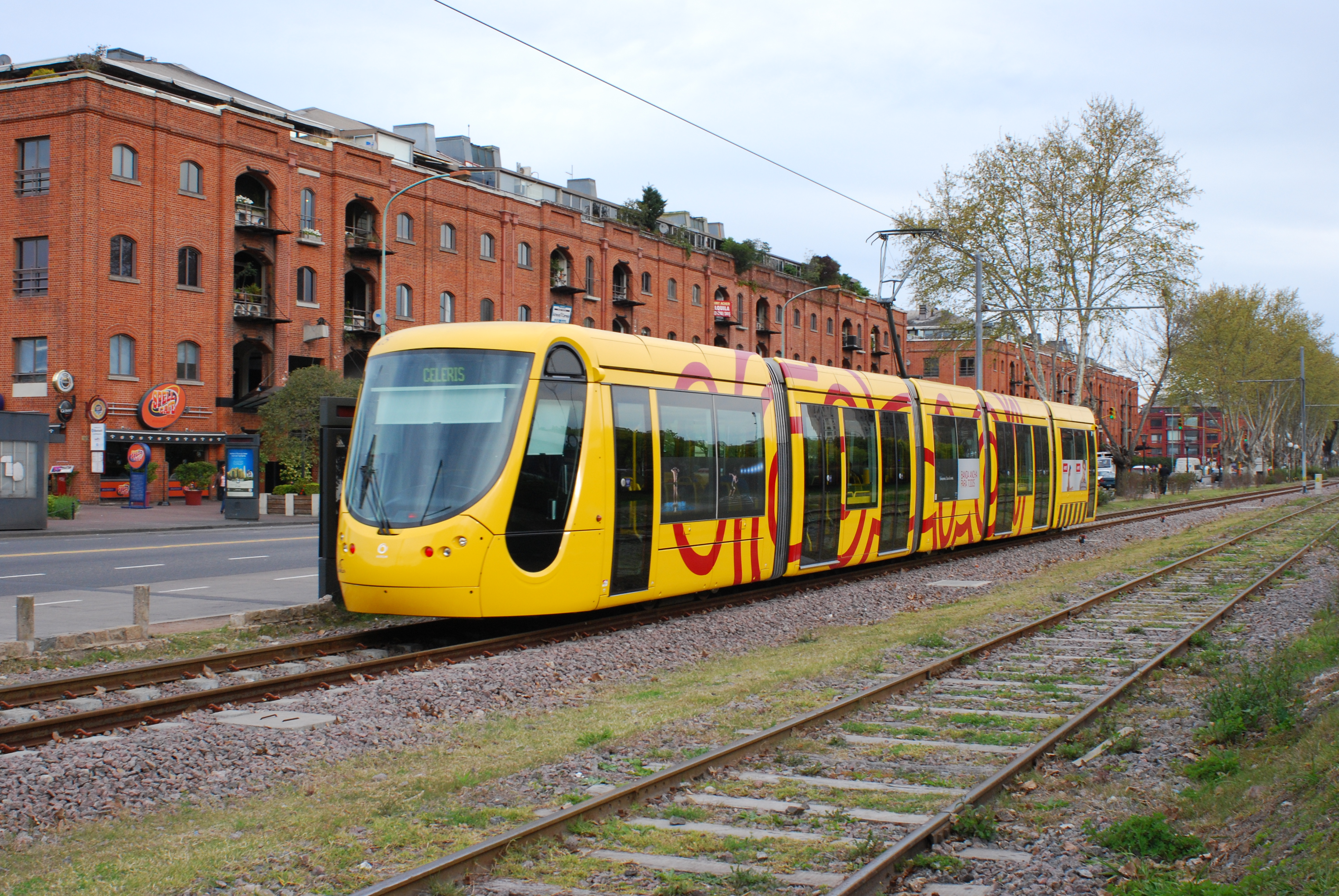
Mulhouse tram

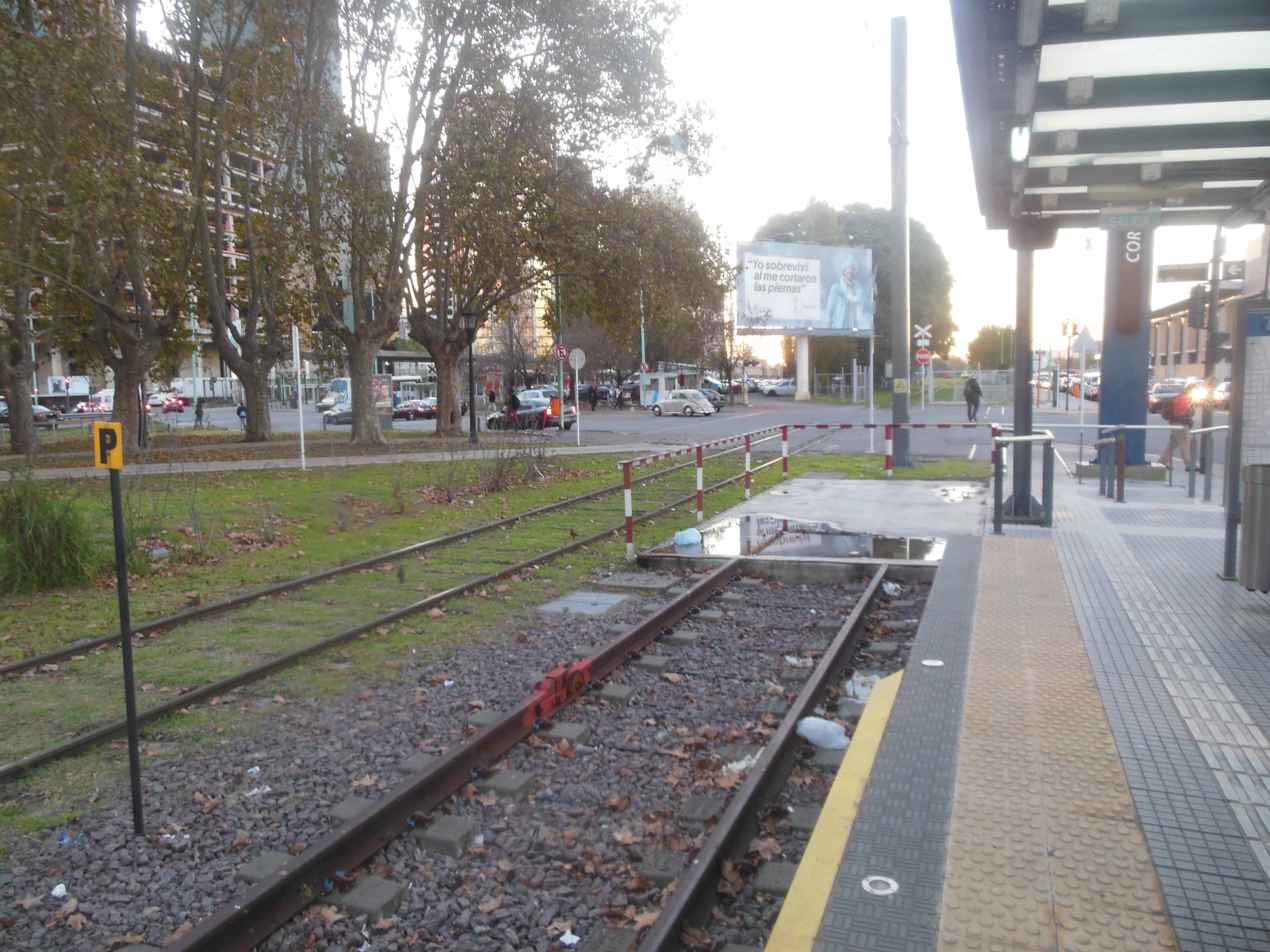
Córdoba terminus

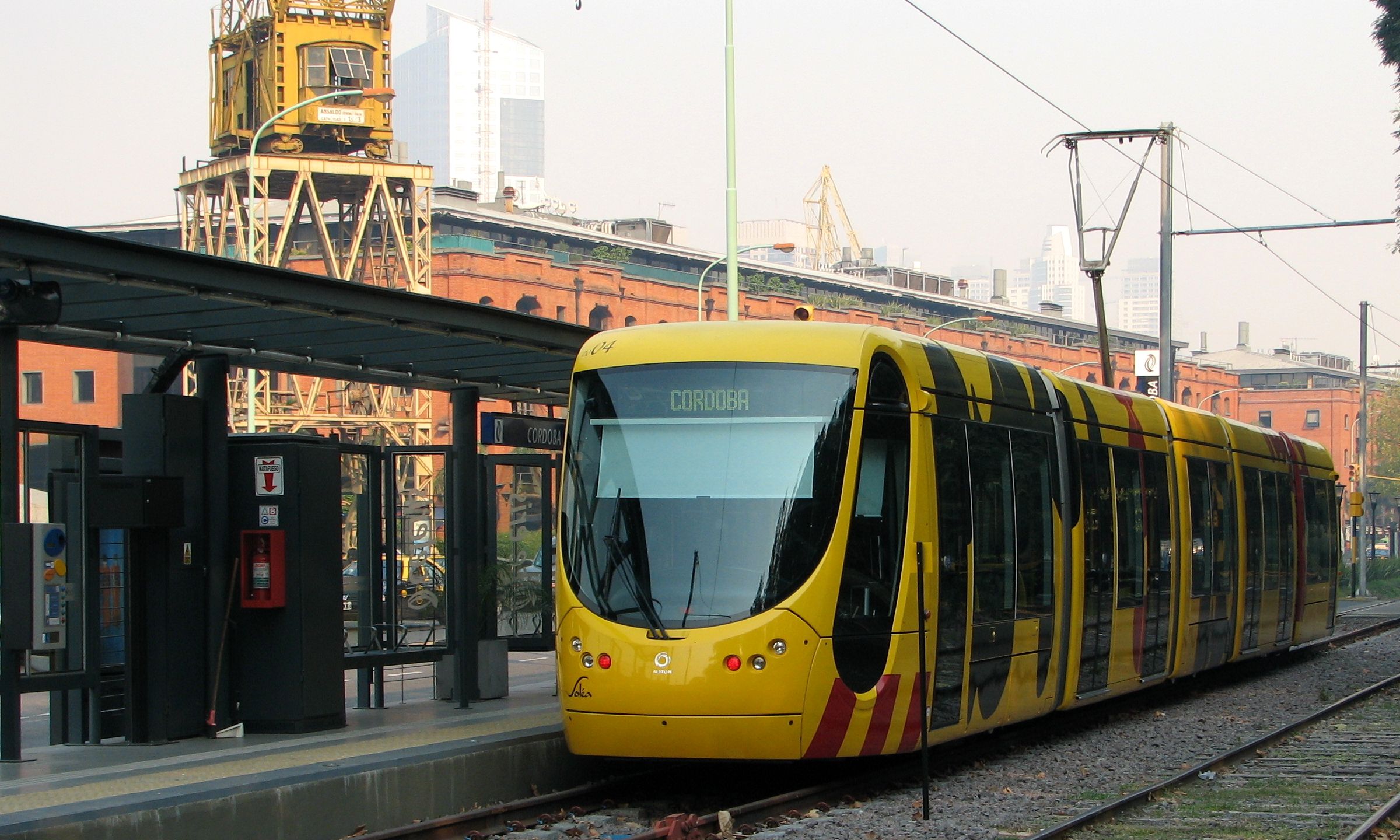
Mulhouse tram in Córdoba station

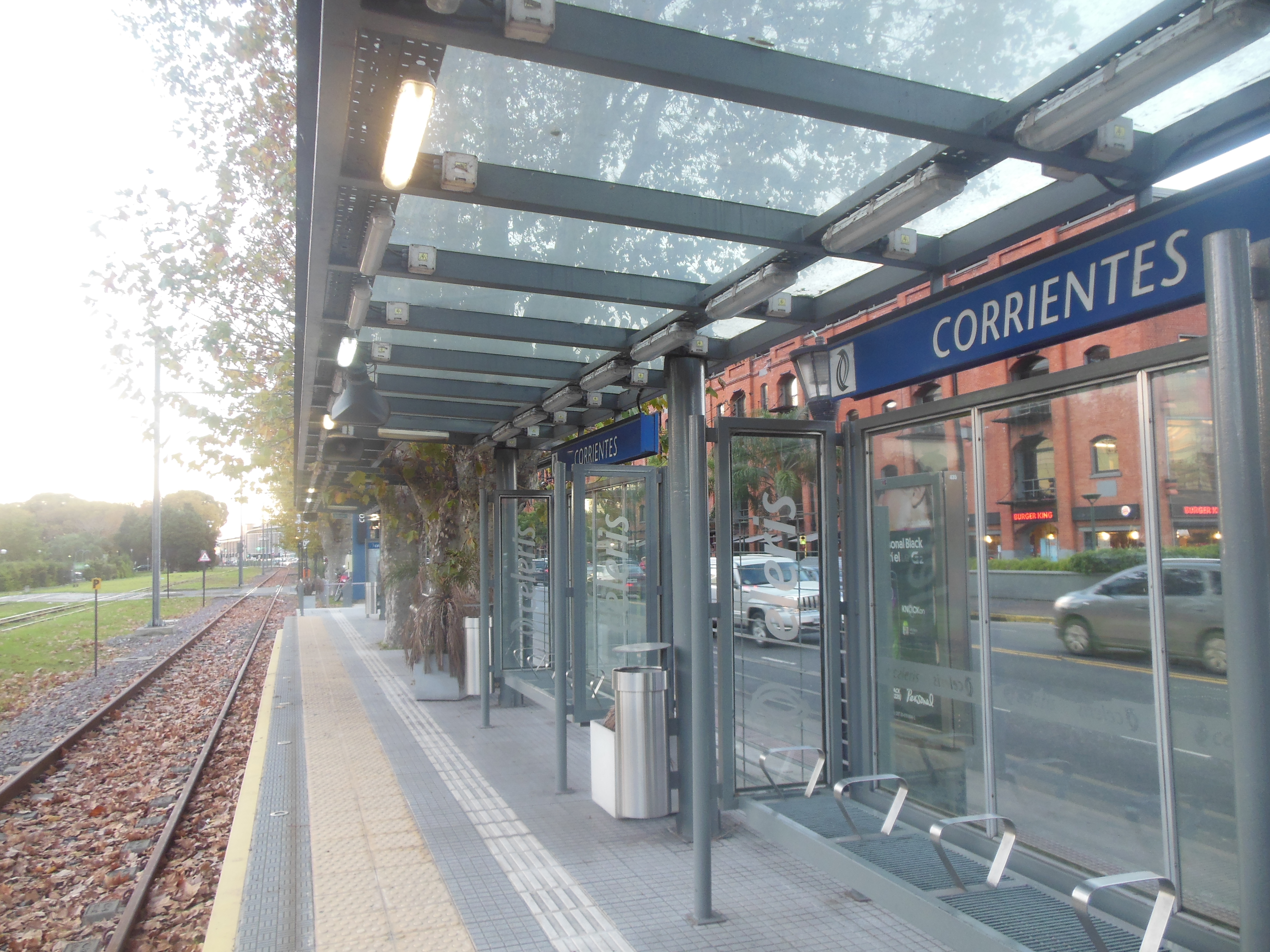
Corrientes station

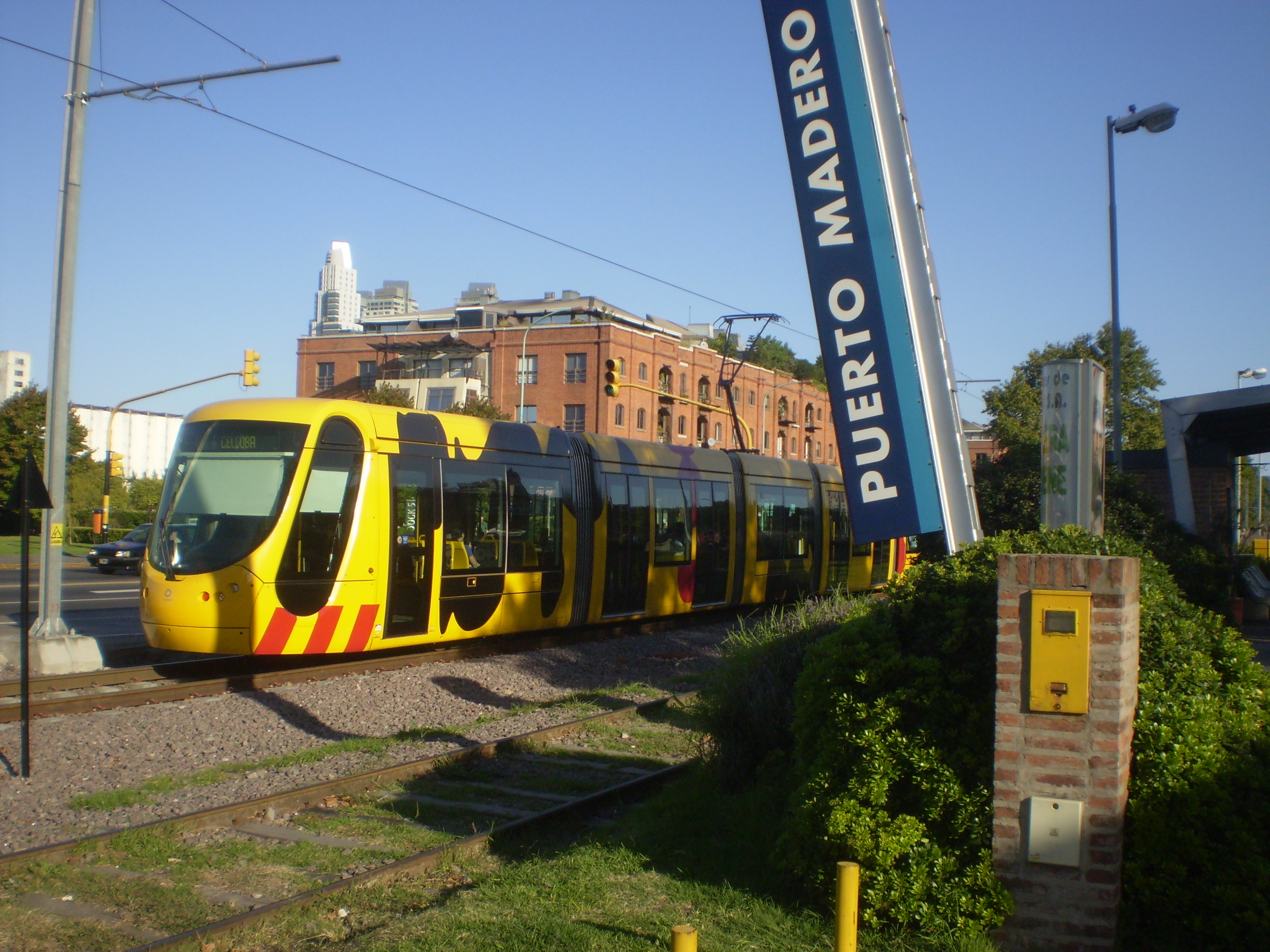
Puerto Madero station
