= El Peligro =

- Location in Argentina
- Coordinates: 34°56′S 58°10′W
- Country: Argentina
- Province: Buenos Aires
- Partido: La Plata
- Founded: 1874
- Elevation: 20 m (66 ft)
- CPA Base: B 1933
- Area code: +54 2229

El Peligro is a town in the La Plata Partido of Buenos Aires Province, located about 22 km west from La Plata City (the capital city of the District) and about 45 km southeast from Buenos Aires City.

The town has borders with other towns of the same partido (county) namely: Buchanan, Abasto, Arturo Seguí and Melchor Romero, as well as bordering on Berazategui Partido.

There is not any train station inside its borders; the nearest being Villa Elisa Station. The town is about 40 km southeast of Ministro Pistarini International Airport (the main international airport of Argentina).

== Accesses ==
Its main accesses from Buenos Aires City are the Autovía 2 (former National Route 2) and the Provincial Route 36; both routes meet themselves and run alongside one another up to National Route A004 in the Berazategui District, where Autovía 2 ends and Provincial Route 36 continues its way to Buenos Aires City. The National Route A004 is a highway which at the Hudson Junction connects itself to Ricardo Balbin Highway (better known as Buenos Aires-La Plata Highway).

From La Plata City, its main accesses are also the Autovía 2 (former National Route 2) and the Provincial Route 36; to which one could access through both, 44th and 520th avenues. Another way to get to the town from La Plata City is through Ricardo Balbin Highway (better known as Buenos Aires-La Plata Highway), then taking National Route A004 and finally Autovía 2 or Provincial Route 36.

A secondary way to get to the town is the former Provincial Route 19 (commonly known as Arana Avenue), which links it to Villa Elisa, another town of the same District.

== Characteristics ==
A company called EDELAP is responsible for the electricity supply, and the telephonic service as well as gas supply is provided by a cooperative. There's no running water supply. Mobile Telephone services are available through three operators: Movistar, Claro and Personal (the three available in Argentina).

== Primary schools ==
- School N°123 "Estados Unidos de Brasil", located at the km 44.5 of the Autovía 2.
- School N°49 "José Hernández", located at the km 44.0 of the Provincial Route 36.
