= Avenida Leopoldo Lugones =

Highway in Argentina

- Autopista Dr. Arturo Umberto Illia not included.

Route information
- Maintained by AUSA
- Length: 10.5 km (6.5 mi)

Major junctions
- South end: Avenida 9 de Julio, Arroyo in Downtown Buenos Aires
- Paseo del Bajo near Retiro; Aeroparque Jorge Newbery near Palermo; Avenida Guillermo Udaondo in Nunez (Estadio Monumental Antonio Vespucio Liberti)
- North end: Avenida del Libertador / Avenida General Paz to near Vicente Lopez

Location
- Country: Argentina

Highway system
- Highways in Argentina

Avenida Leopoldo Lugones, and its southern continuation, Autopista Dr. Arturo Umberto Illia, is a freeway running from Avenida General Paz in the north, which continues to an interchange with National Route 9 and the Paseo del Bajo (currently a truck and bus only road) in the city center. It provides access to Downtown Buenos Aires from the northern suburbs, and from Rosario, Cordoba, and other northern destinations. Due to the lack of a complete bypass of the city, it also connects truck and bus traffic from La Plata to the north. It runs along the east shore of the city, providing access to Aeroparque Jorge Newbery.

== Route description ==
=== Autopista Dr. Arturo Umberto Illia ===
The highway begins at a four way intersection between Arroyo and Avenida 9 de Julio, which continues south. It runs north over a railyard and then Barrio Mugica, a residential neighborhood. Merging with the Paseo de Bajo, it runs to a tollbooth. Running north, the highway has two more interchanges, the northern one leading to Aeroparque Jorge Newbery. After this interchange, the highway changes name to Avenida Leopoldo Lugones.

=== Avenida Leopoldo Lugones ===
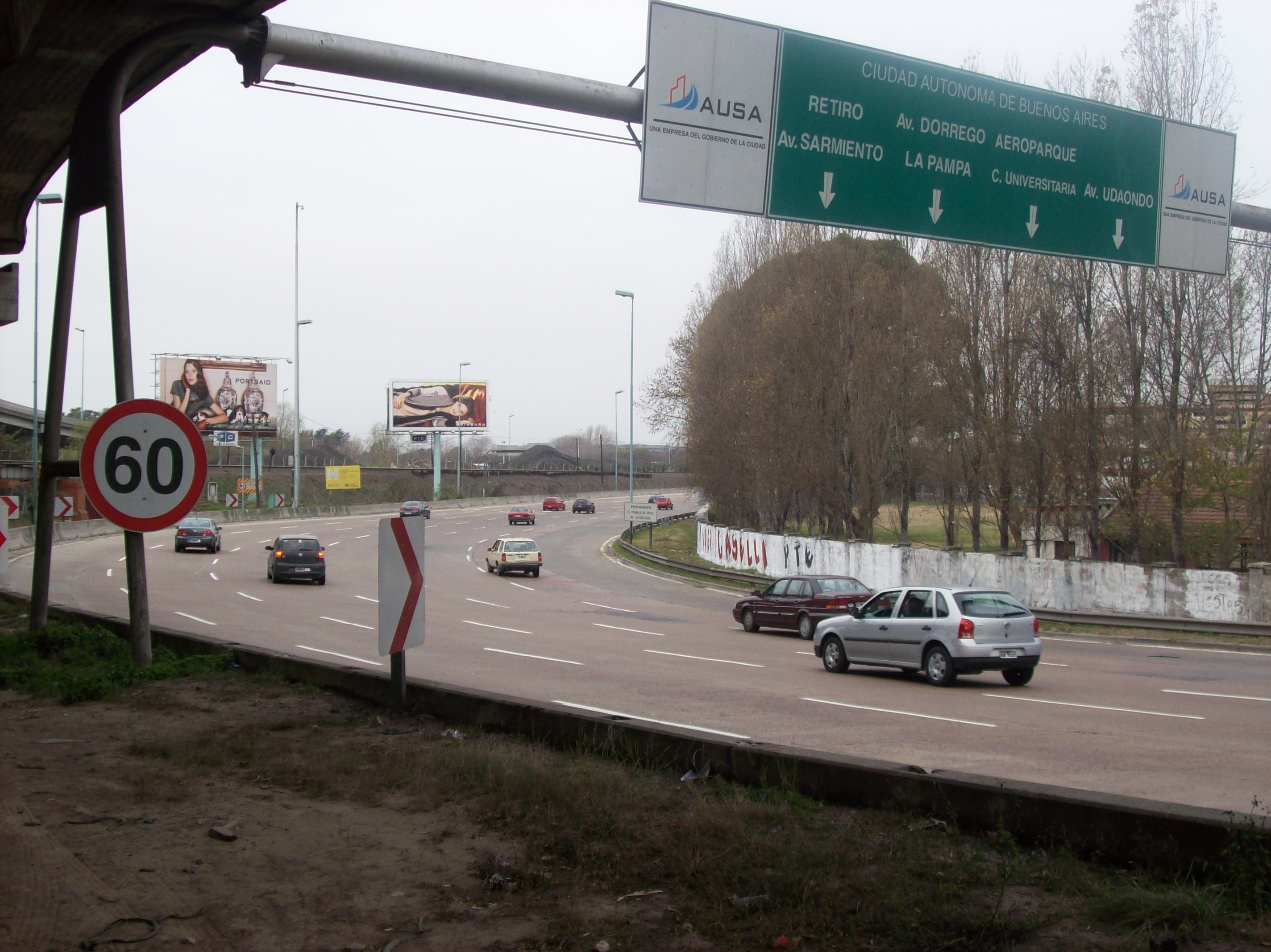
Avenida Leopoldo Lugones at the city limit curve.

The highway continues to the north along Coronel Jordan C. Wysocki Park, with the northbound lanes also known as Avenida Intendente Cantilo, with interchanges at Avenida Dorrego, La Pampa, and the road leading to Estadio Monumental Antonio Vespucio Liberti and University of Buenos Aires. At the city limits, there is a sharp bend in the freeway, and then is a turbine interchange with Avenida del Libertador. The freeway changes names again to Avenida General Paz, and continues to an interchange with National Route 9.

== History ==
The highways that make up the Avenida Leopoldo Lugones, along with the Paseo del Bajo (for trucks and buses only as of 2021) were first proposed in the Plan de Autopistas Urbanas. During the military dictatorship, this corridor was not constructed, except for the twinning of the connection between it and Avenida General Paz.

=== Avenida Leopoldo Lugones ===
Avenida Leopoldo Lugones between Avenida Sarmiento and Avenida General Paz was opened to motor traffic in 1972. The bridge between Avenida General Paz and Avenida Leopoldo Lugones was twinned in 1978.

In 1996, the only at grade intersection that this road had at La Pampa was replaced with an interchange, and a new street, Distribuidor Scalabrini Ortiz, was added connecting to the waterfront.

With the widening of Avenida General Paz and National Route 9 in the 1990s, the four southbound lanes of Avenida Lugones formed a bottleneck at peak hours, so the Government of the City of Buenos Aires entrusted the company AUSA to add an additional lane. The city government opened this lane on September 24, 2004.

=== Autopista Dr. Arturo Umberto Illia ===
AV1 Norte, which was also part of the 1977 plan, began its construction only in the mid-1990s . Finally, its first section was inaugurated on October 31, 1995. On May 16, 1996, the stretch between Arroyo and Jerónimo Salguero streets was inaugurated by Mayor Jorge Dominguez. However, the northbound lanes had not been completed. The construction of this section required the displacement of the inhabitants of Villa 31 de Retiro. Due to public pressure, he gave up building the Autopista Ribereña, which would link the AU Illia with the Autopista Buenos Aires-La Plata.

== Exit List ==
Partido or Departamento	Location	km	mi	Destinations	Notes
Buenos Aires	Retiro	0.00	0.00	Avenida 9 de Julio	Continues south as Avenida 9 de Julio
Buenos Aires	1.000 mi = 1.609 km; 1.000 km = 0.621 mi: Closed/former; Concurrency terminus; Electronic toll collection; Incomplete access; Route transition				
