= Peligro =

Peligro may refer to:

- Peligro (Reik album), 2011
  - "Peligro (Reik song)", a song from the album
- Peligro (Shakira album), 1993
  - "Peligro (Shakira song)", a song from the album
- "Peligro de Extinción", a 2012 song by Ivy Queen
- "Peligro", a song by Mano Negra from the 1989 album Puta's Fever
- D. H. Peligro (1959–2022), drummer of the Dead Kennedys

== See also ==
- El Peligro, a town in Buenos Aires Province, Argentina
