= Singuil =

Coordinates: 27°49′S 65°52′W

- Municipality and village
- Interactive map of Singuil
- Country: Argentina
- Province: Catamarca Province
- Time zone: UTC−3 (ART)

Singuil is a rural village located in the Ambato Department of Catamarca Province, north-western Argentina, within the Municipality of Los Varela.

The village lies approximately 85 kilometres north of San Fernando del Valle de Catamarca, the provincial capital, along Provincial Route 1. The surrounding landscape is characterized by mountainous terrain, valleys, streams, and areas of agricultural activity.

According to the 2022 national census conducted by the Instituto Nacional de Estadística y Censos (INDEC), Singuil has a population of 353 inhabitants living in 103 households. This represented an increase from 295 residents recorded in the 2010 census.The locality covers an area of approximately 0.76km², with a population density of about 466 inhabitants per square kilometre.
