= Provincial Route 1 (Buenos Aires) =

Highway in Argentina

Provincial Route 1
- Ruta provincial 1
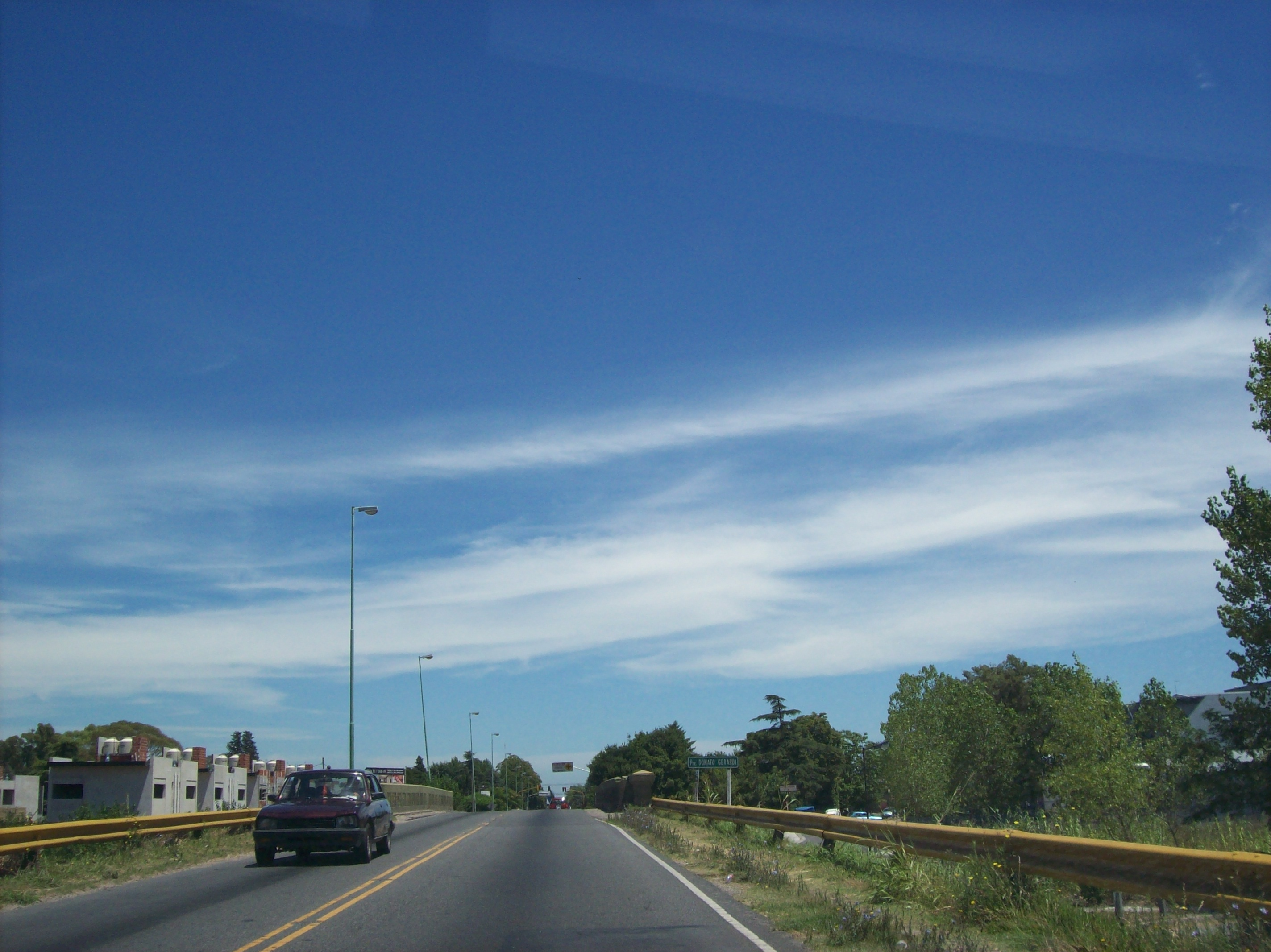
- Donato Gerardi Bridge over the closed tracks of the General Roca Railway

Route information
- Length: 21 km (13 mi)

Major junctions
- Southeast end: Avenida 532 in La Plata
- Northwest end: and in Juan María Gutiérrez

Location
- Country: Argentina
- Municipalities: La Plata, Berazategui

Highway system
- Highways in Argentina

Provincial Route 1 is a 21 km (13 mi) long paved highway located in the partidos of La Plata and Berazategui in the province of Buenos Aires, in Argentina. From its beginning to the Cruce Gutiérrez, the route is part of the Camino General Belgrano, a road paved between 1912 and 1916, which is a narrow road with one lane in each direction. The rest of the route belongs to Camino Centenario.

It was part of National Route 1 (km 34.10 to 54.00) until the national government transferred this road to the province in 1988.
