= Ranelagh, Buenos Aires =

Ranelagh
- Town
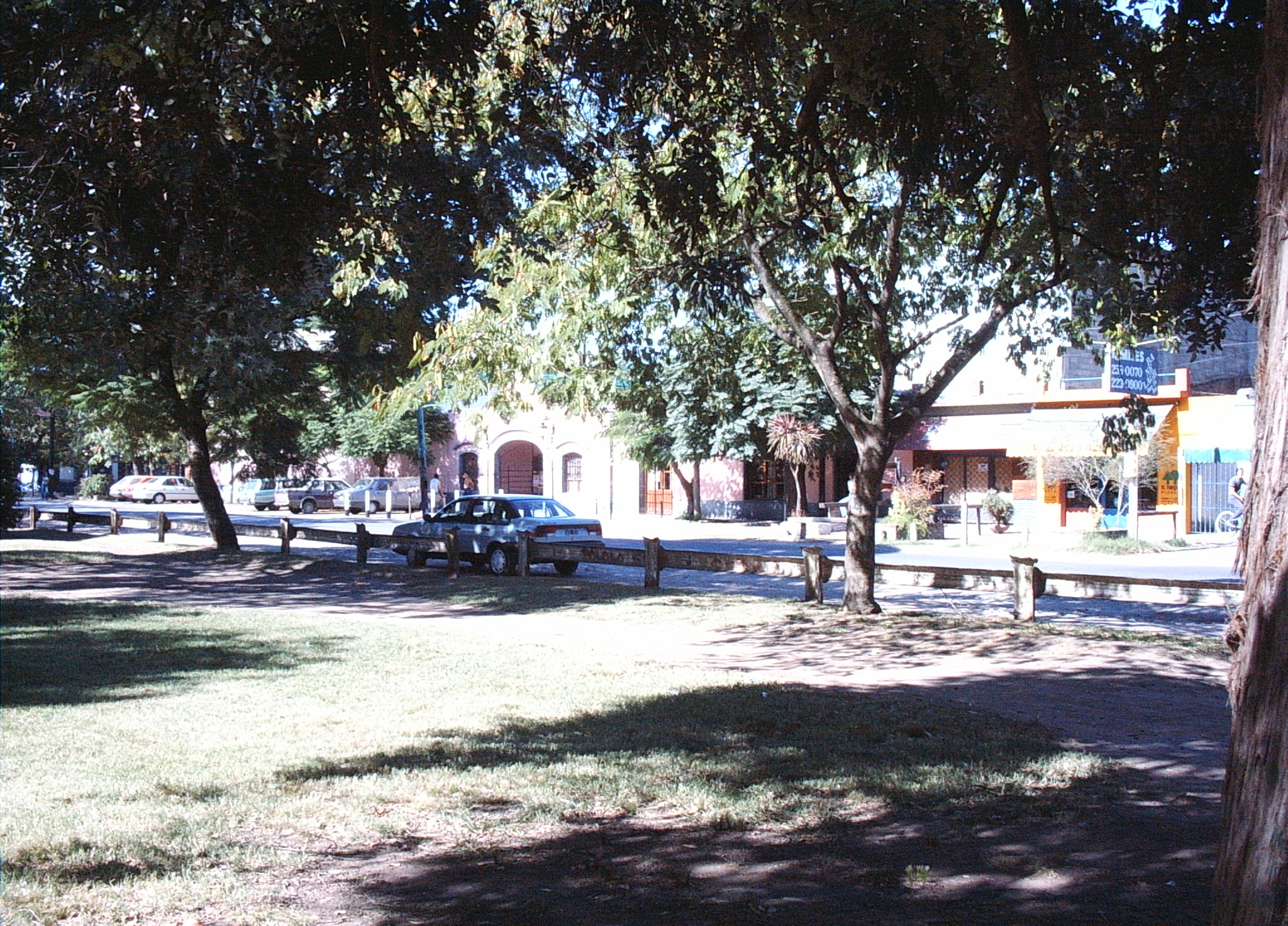
- Partial view of Eva Hajduk Park, a local arboretum

- Location in Greater Buenos Aires
- Coordinates: 34°48′S 58°12′W
- Country: Argentina
- Province: Buenos Aires
- Partido: Berazategui Partido
- Founded: April 30, 1911

Area
  - Total: 6 km^{2} (2.3 sq mi)
- Elevation: 20 m (66 ft)

Population (2001 census [INDEC])
  - Total: 15,262
  - Density: 2,500/km^{2} (6,600/sq mi)
- CPA Base: B 1886
- Area code: +54 011
- Website: El Portal de Ranelagh

Ranelagh is a town in Berazategui Partido, in the southeastern section of Greater Buenos Aires.

== History ==
Ranelagh was initially developed by the Buenos Aires Great Southern Railway, which opened a station at the site in 1911, and formed Compañía de Tierras del Sud (Southlands Company) to oversee the real estate development plan. The town's name was in homage to the Viscount Ranelagh, an Irish nobleman who had Ranelagh Gardens built in Chelsea, England in 1742. The first ten chalets (built in Tudor style) were completed in 1913, the post office in 1915, and the first school in 1916.

The El Progreso country club was established in 1924. It would be reestablished as the Ranelagh Golf Club in 1943, and became among the most important in the southern Buenos Aires metro area; the course was later named in honor of 7-time PGA Tour champion Roberto de Vicenzo, a longtime member. The Mercedarian Order of the Roman Catholic Church established a chapel in the town in 1938, and the Nuestra Señora de la Merced (Our Lady of Mercy) Temple was consecrated in 1939. The regional diocese recognized the Parish of Ranelagh in 1941.

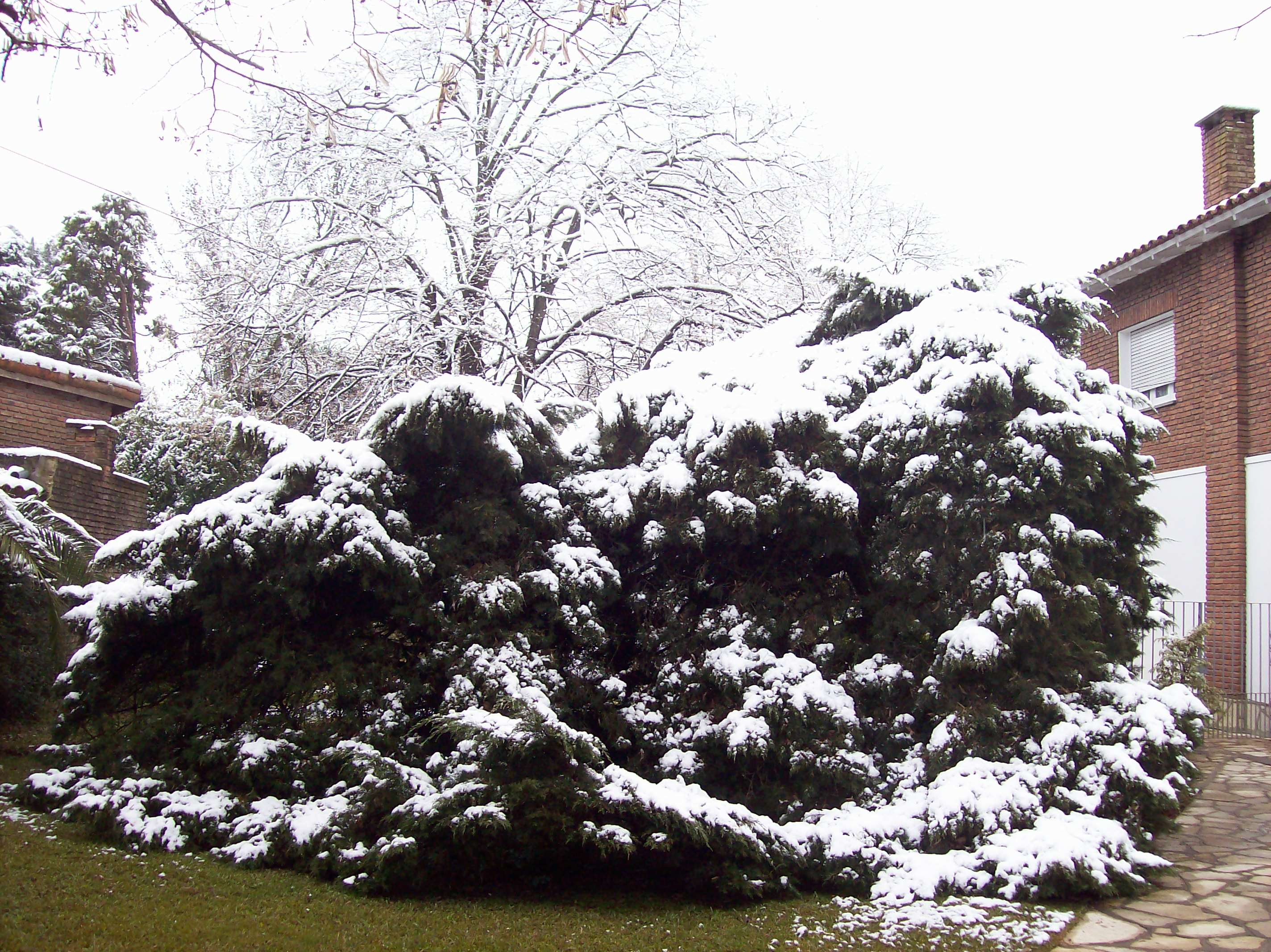
Scene in Ranelagh during the 2007 snow storm

A jitney service was established between Ranelagh and the county seat, Berazategui, in 1944. Ranelagh was the site of the clandestine press organized by the prominent Socialist daily, La Vanguardia, following its closure in 1947. The town's first manufacturing firm (corrugated cardboard maker Zucamor) was established in 1953, and would, despite a 1957 fire, grow to become an important provider of boxes for the Argentine wine industry. Coca-Cola established a bottling plant in Ranelagh in 1958.

Ranelagh was recognized as a Town by the Provincial Legislature in 1967. An extensive lot surrounding the railway station was converted into an arboretum on the initiative of Eva Hajduk, and following her death in 1984, the park was renamed in her honor. The 13,400 m² (144,000 ft²) Berazategui Regional Hospital was built in Ranelagh, and inaugurated in 1994. The town's principal news daily, La Misión, was established by Julio Ortega in 1994.
