= National Route A004 (Argentina) =

Highway in Argentina

National Route A004
- Ruta nacional A004
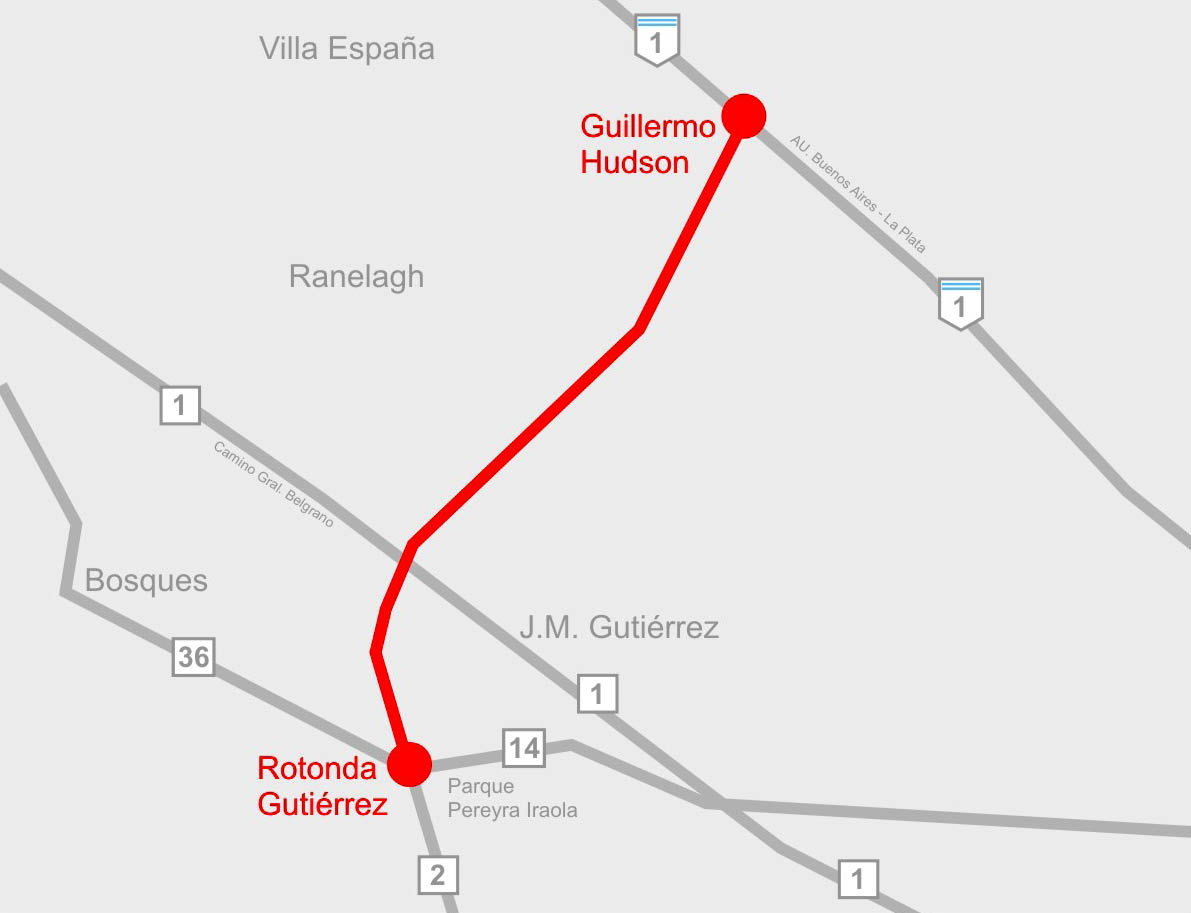

Route information
- Maintained by AUBASA
- Length: 8 km (5.0 mi)
- Existed: 1995–present

Major junctions
- NE end: in Hudson
- SW end: in J.M. Gutiérrez

Location
- Country: Argentina

Highway system
- Highways in Argentina

National Route A004 is a four-lane highway connecting National Route 1 (mostly known as the "Buenos Aires-La Plata highway") at km marker 31 with the Juan María Gutiérrez Roundabout in Greater Buenos Aires. The road extends for 8 km (5 mi) (numbered km 31 to 30), all within the limits of Berazategui Partido in Buenos Aires Province, Argentina.

This road is the obligatory route for the vacation destinations of Mar del Plata and other cities along the coast of Buenos Aires Province as it connects with Autovía 2, so it has high volumes of traffic during the summer months and Easter.

The A004 is currently operated by AUBASA ("Autopistas de Buenos Aires S.A."), a state-owned company owned by the Government of Buenos Aires Province, which also manages the NR 1 and most routes to the cities of Costa Atlántica.

== Overview ==
The highway runs (northeast to southwest) through the towns of Guillermo Enrique Hudson and Juan María Gutiérrez and was built over the old Gutiérrez–Hudson and Valentín Vergara avenues. The latter one was the border of the partidos of Berazategui and Florencio Varela.

The road was opened to the public on 17 November 1995, starting at the southern end at the Juan María Gutiérrez roundabout. Many important roads connected at this point, including PR 36 to the north and south, PR Route 1 (mostly known as "Camino General Belgrano"), and this highway. This dangerous cross required a bridge to be built over the roundabout so traffic coming from the Buenos Aires–La Plata highway could continue to the coast without reducing speed. This bridge was opened in 1996.

The construction company that built it has the concession of the road until 30 June 2017.

== Major intersections ==
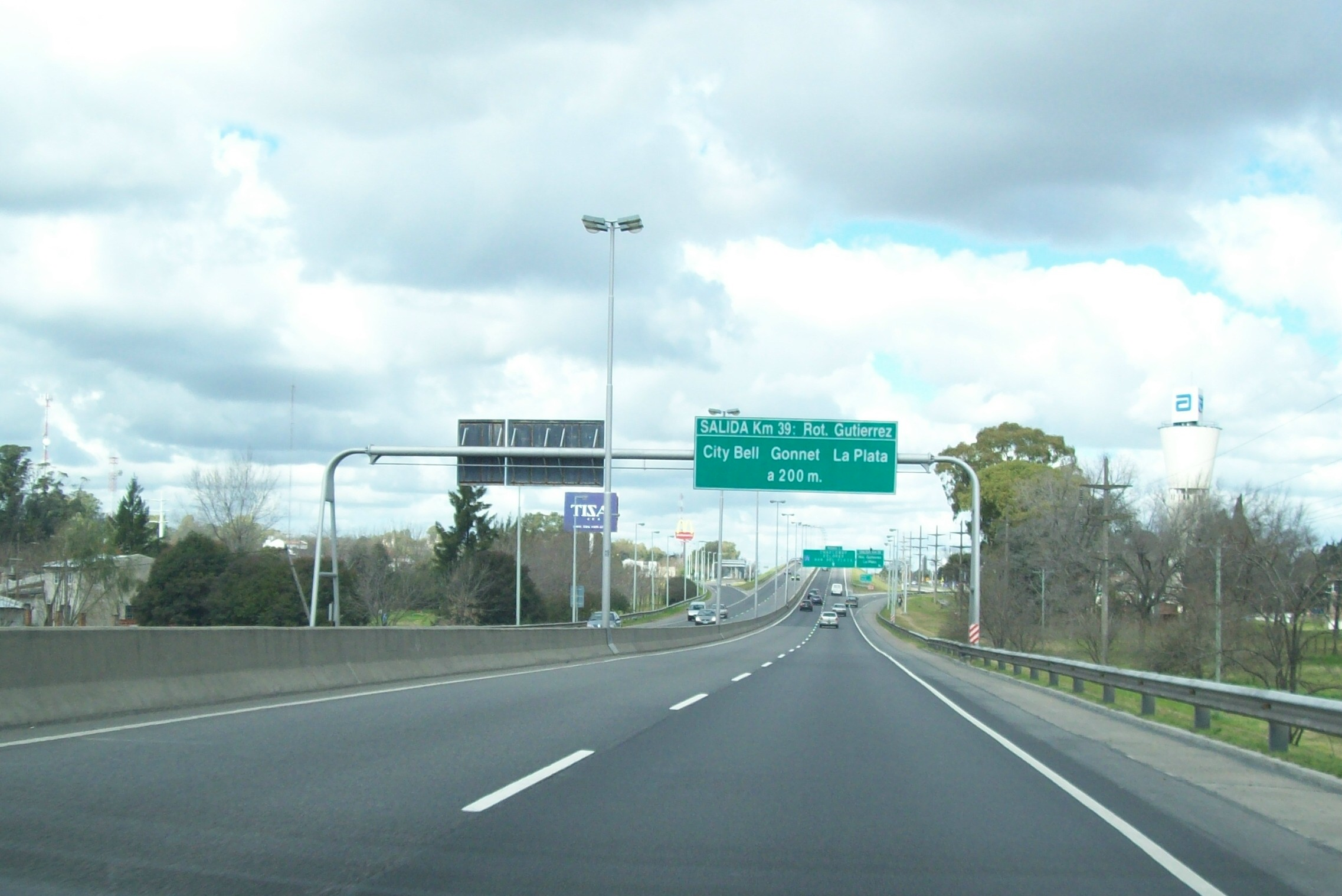
South view of the A004 highway, August 2008

Partido	Km	Road / Int.	Notes
Berazategui	31	National Route 1 (Argentina)v	To Buenos Aires (north) and La Plata (south)
Berazategui	32		To Quilmes (west)
Berazategui	37	(Note: Also known as "Camino General Belgrano")	To Gerli (west) and Tolosa (east)
Berazategui	39		To Tolosa (east)
Berazategui	39	(Note: Calchaquí Avenue, from the A004 to Bernal.)	To Acceso Sudeste in Bernal (west)
Berazategui	39	Provincial Route 2 (Buenos Aires)	To Mar del Plata (south)
