= Paseo del Bajo =

Highway in Buenos Aires, Argentina

Paseo del Bajo

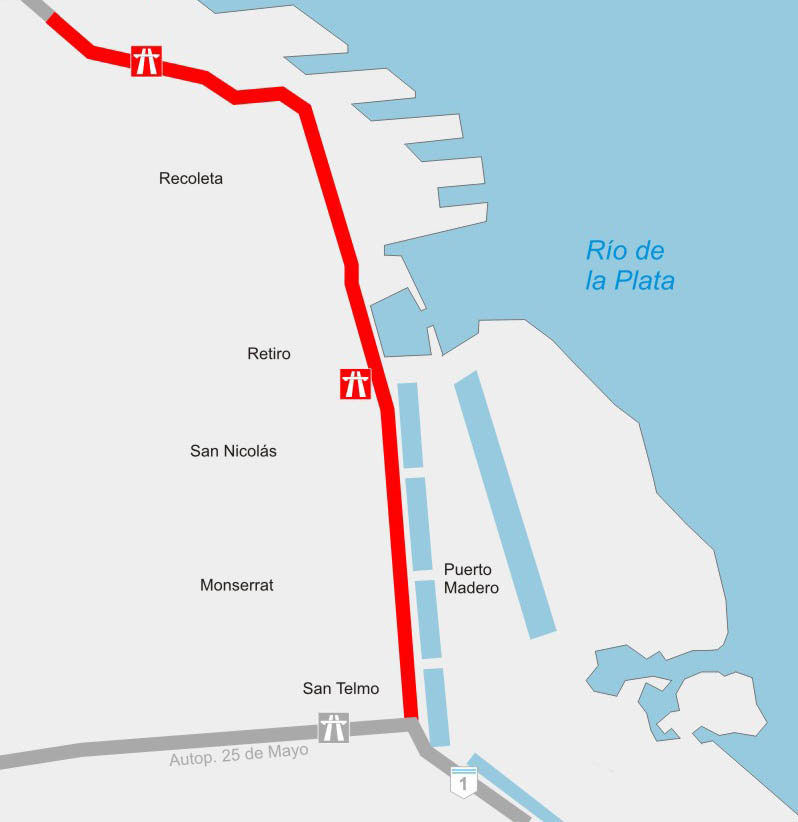

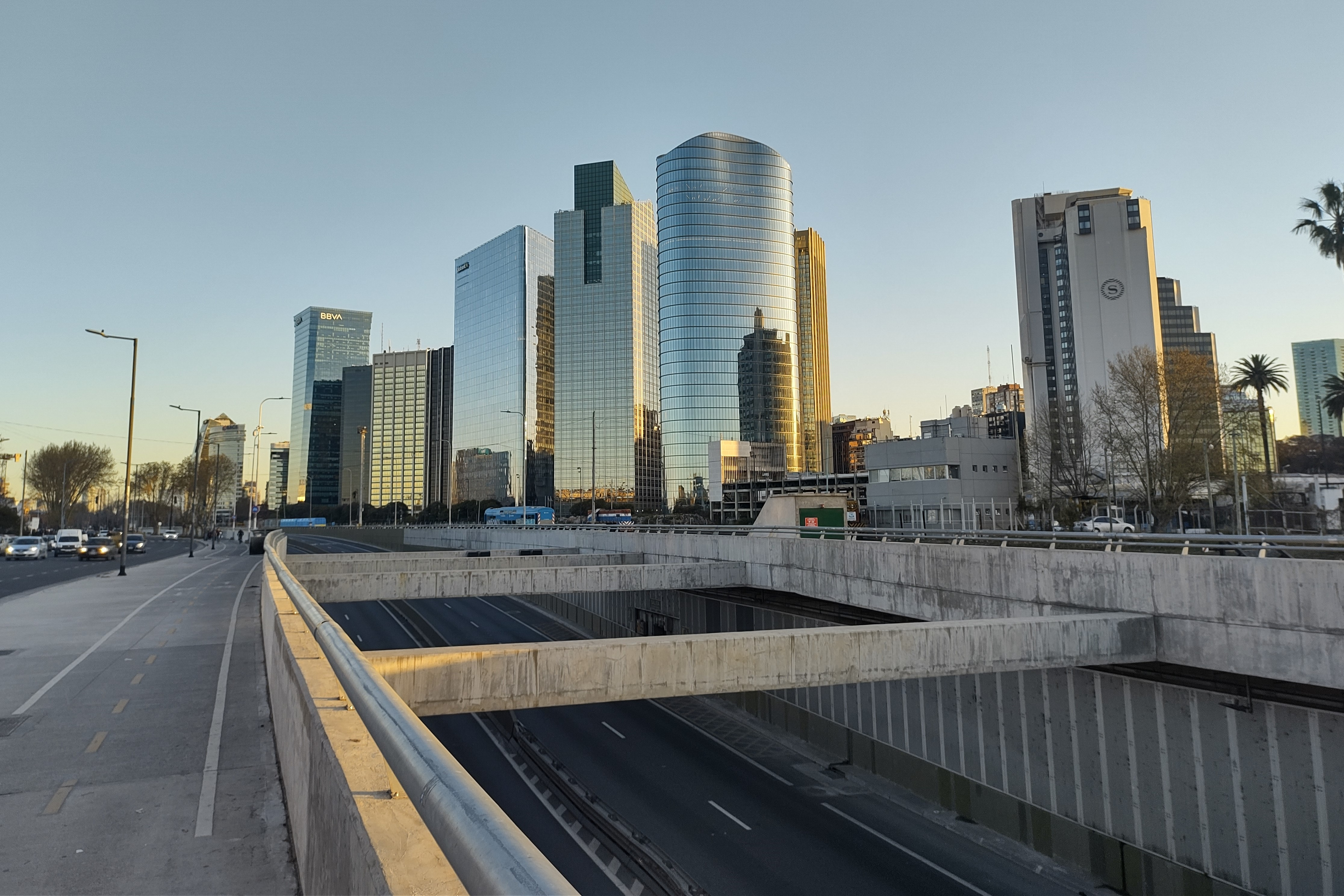
- Paseo del Bajo in 2022

Route information
- Maintained by AUSA
- Length: 7.1 km (4.4 mi)
- Existed: May 2019–present
- Restrictions: Commercial vehicles only

Major junctions
- North end: AU Arturo Illia
- Retiro bus station, Av. Córdoba, Av. Corrientes, Av. Belgrano, Av. Independencia, AU 25 de Mayo
- South end: to La Plata (south)

Location
- Country: Argentina
- Major cities: Buenos Aires
- Towns: Recoleta, Retiro, Puerto Madero, San Nicolás, Monserrat, San Telmo

Highway system
- Highways in Argentina

Paseo del Bajo - officially named Brigadier General Juan Manuel de Rosas, is a highway in the city of Buenos Aires, Argentina. It joins the 25 de Mayo, Arturo Illia and Buenos Aires-La Plata highways. It has a length of 7.1 km (4 mi) with two lanes in each direction.

It runs between Alicia M. de Justo, Ingeniero Huergo, Eduardo Madero, Antártida Argentina, and Ramón Castillo Avenues, through the barrios of Recoleta, Retiro, Puerto Madero, San Nicolás, Monserrat, San Telmo within the city of Buenos Aires. The freeway lanes are truck and bus only.

This highway is operated by "Autopistas Urbanas S.A." (AUSA), a limited company that builds and operates highways within the city of Buenos Aires. Its main shareholder is the Government of the City.

== Overview ==
The freeway consists of four lanes, and is for trucks and long-distance buses exclusively, with eight lanes on parallel streets for light vehicles (four on each side, northbound and southbound). It was inaugurated on 27 May 2019.

At north, Paseo del Bajo starts in Arturo Illia Highway, then running along Ramón S. Castillo Avenue near the port of Buenos Aires. It runs along Antártida Argentina, and Eduardo Madero / Alicia M. de Justo Avenues, with connections with Retiro bus and railway stations. The highway ends at south of the city, connecting to 25 de Mayo (at west) and Buenos Aires–La Plata Highways (at south). In Puerto Madero and San Telmo, Paseo del Bajo is overpassed by the extensions of Córdoba, Viamonte, Lavalle, Corrientes, Juan D. Perón, Moreno, Belgrano, Independencia, and Estados Unidos.

An average of 134,000 vehicles runs on Paseo del Bajo per day. It includes 15,326 trucks, 28,245 buses and 91,070 light vehicles.

Paseo del Bajo included a park, named "Parque del Bajo", located between Belgrano and Corrientes avenues (north-south) and Paseo Colón and Huergo avenues (west-east), with an extension of 102,000 m2.

== Controversy ==
Some allegations of corruptions were reported, accusing Chief of Government Horacio Rodriguez Larreta to favour a company owned by a cousin of Mauricio Macri (then President of Argentina), granting it concession for the works. The General Audit of Buenos Aires denounced that the process was irregular and corrupt in favour of IECSA, the company owned by Angelo Calcaterra, cousin of Macri, for AR$ 3 million.

The Audit reported surchargers of up to 513%. Nevertheless, Federal Judge Claudio Bonadío closed the case, acquitting Rodríguez Larreta and Guillermo Dietrich (Ministry of Transport) of all charges.

A minority of the funding was loaned from the CAF – Development Bank of Latin America and the Caribbean.

== Major intersections ==
District (CABA)	km	mi	Exit	Destination(s)	Notes
Retiro	1	1.24	2	Retiro bus station (west)	
Retiro	2.1	1.30	1	Av. de los Inmigrantes – Port of Buenos Aires (east)	
San Nicolás	2.4	1.49	2	Av. Córdoba (west) – Cecilia Grierson street (east)	
San Nicolás	3.5	2.14	1	Viamonte st. (west)	
San Nicolás	3.8	2.36	1	Lavalle st. (west)	
San Nicolás	3.9	2.42	1	Av. Corrientes (west) – Libertad Palace	
San Nicolás	4.2	2.60	1	Tte. Gral. Perón st. (west)	
Monserrat	4.8	2.98	1	Moreno st. (west)	
Monserrat	4.9	3.04	2	Av. Belgrano (west) – Azucena Villaflor st. (east)	
San Telmo	5.5	3.41	1	Av. Independencia (west)	
San Telmo	5.6	3.47	1	Estados Unidos st. (west)	
San Telmo	6	3.72	2	AU 25 de Mayo to AU. Perito Moreno / Av. Dellepiane (west)	Both roads end in Avenida General Paz, becoming other highways

== Gallery ==
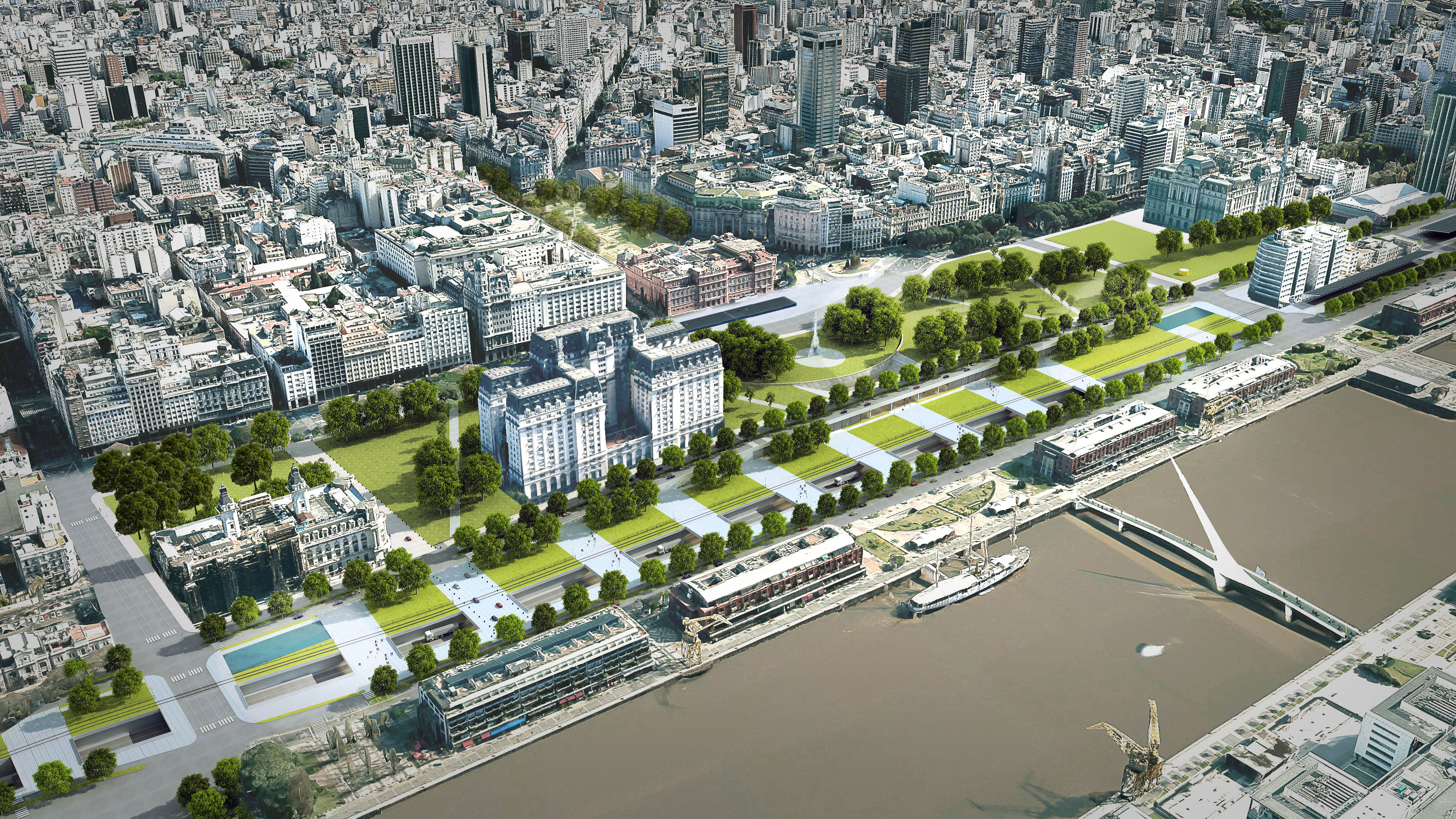

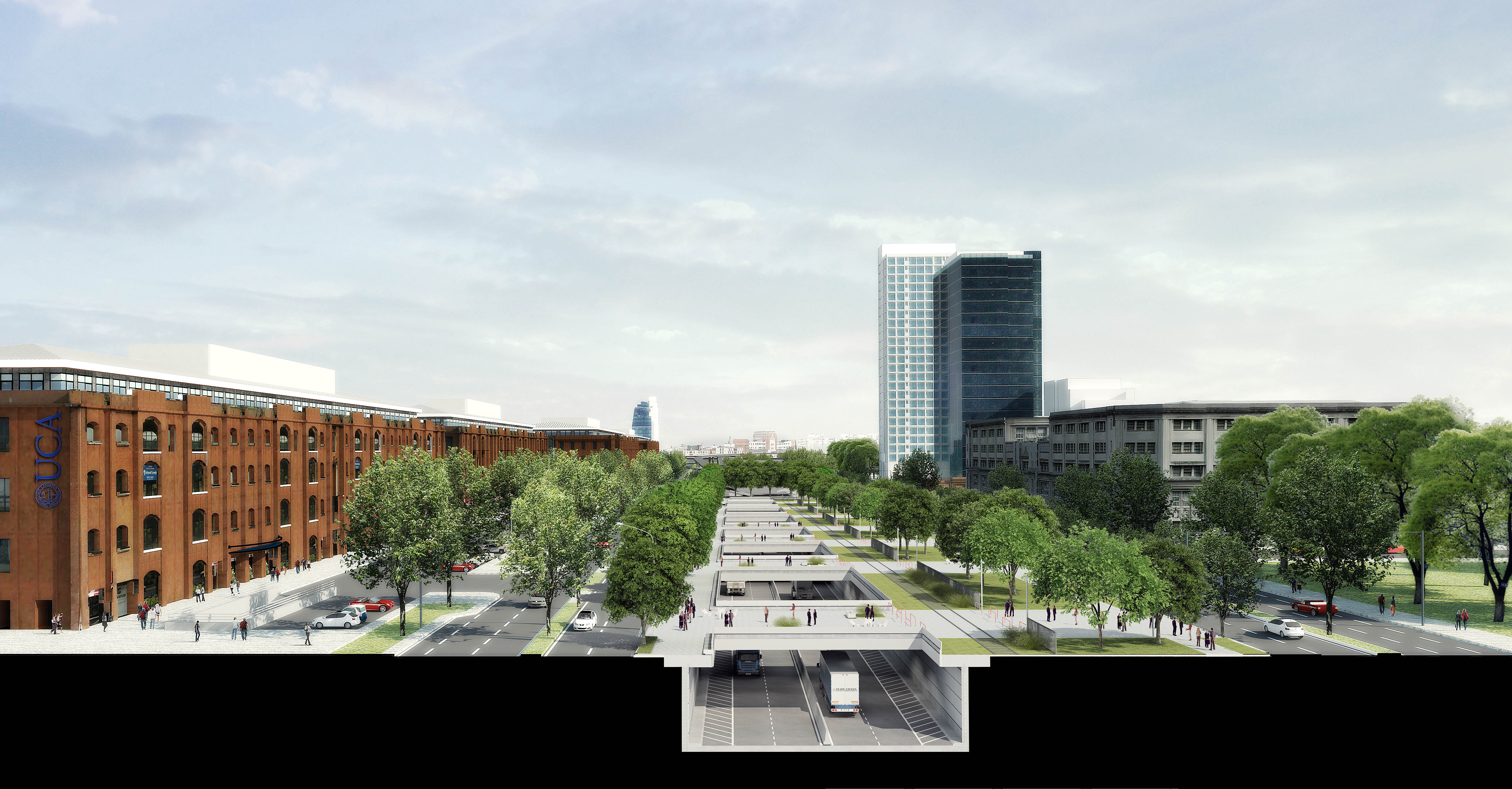

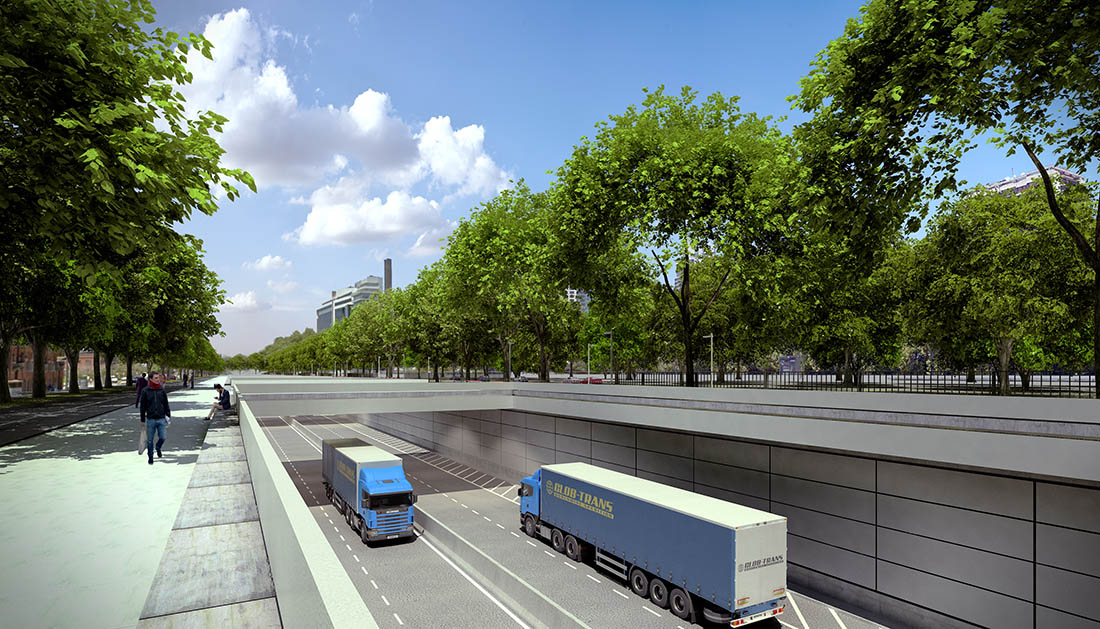

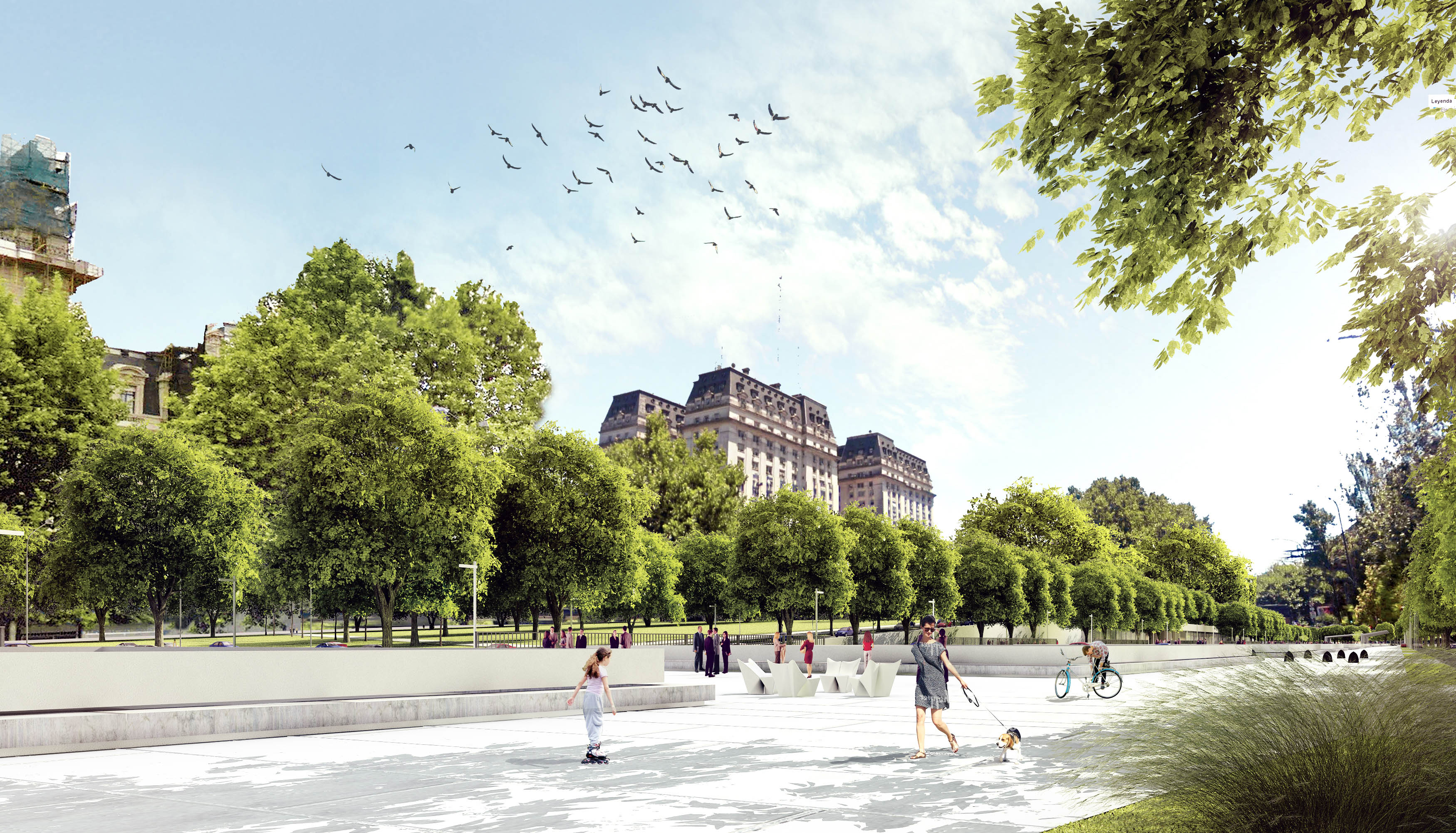

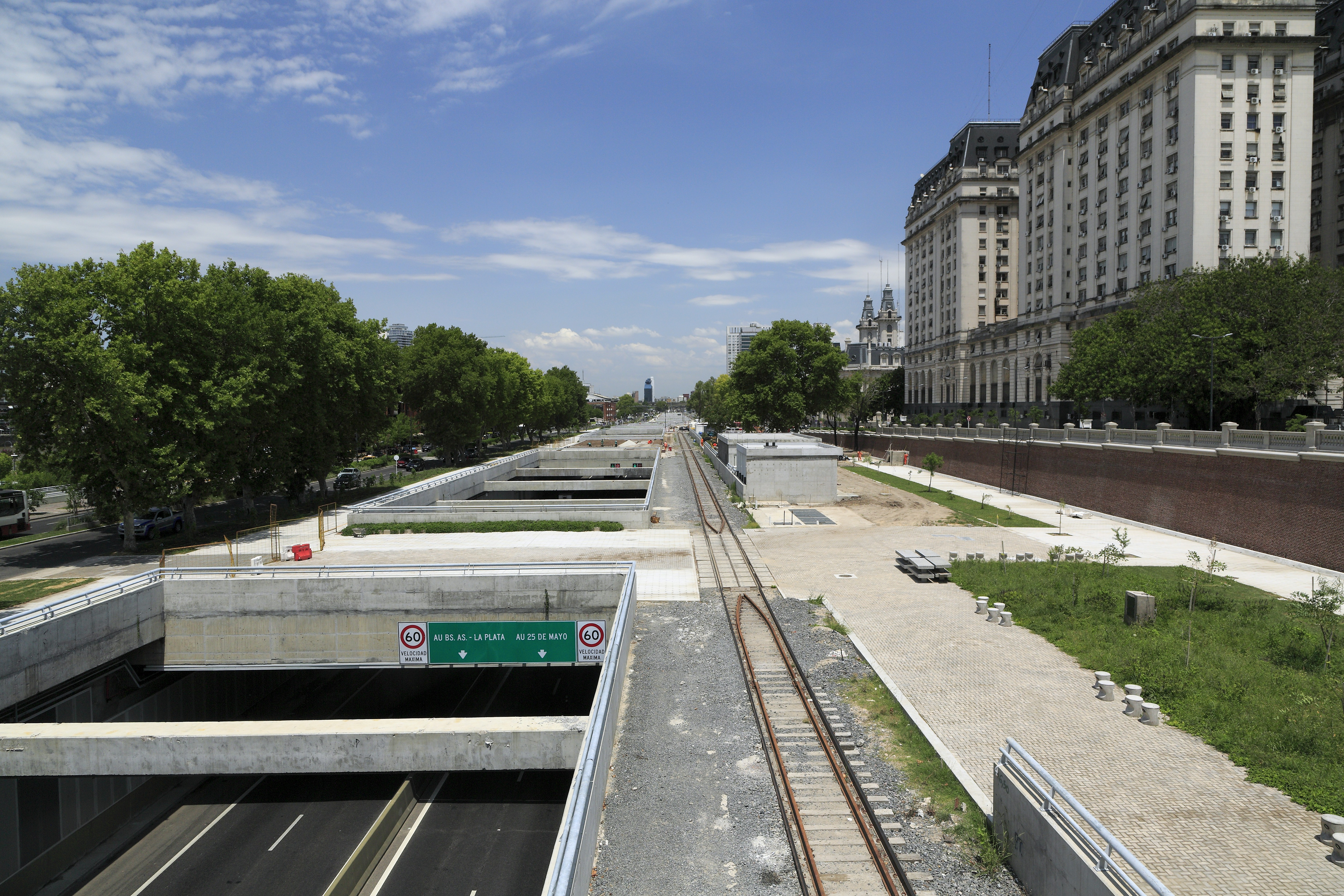
