= National Route 1 (Argentina) =

Highway in Argentina

National Route 1
- Ruta nacional 1

Route information
- Length: 50 km (31 mi)
- Existed: 1995–present

Major junctions
- North end: 25 de Mayo Highway; Paseo del Bajo in Buenos Aires
- in Hudson
- South end: in Ensenada

Location
- Country: Argentina

Highway system
- Highways in Argentina

National Route 1, also known as Buenos Aires–La Plata Highway and officially called Autopista Doctor Ricardo Balbín since 2004, is a highway that connects the 25 de Mayo Highway and Paseo del Bajo in the city of Buenos Aires with the Provincial Route 11, near the city of La Plata. It has a length of 50 km (31 mi) with two or four lanes on each direction in different areas, and is indicated in red in the map.

On km marker 31 it connects with National Route A004, the main road to the coastal tourist areas of Mar del Plata and others in Buenos Aires Province. The highway runs (from northeast to southeast) through the partidos of Avellaneda, Quilmes, Berazategui, Ensenada, and La Plata.

This highway is currently operated by AUBASA ("Autopistas de Buenos Aires S.A."), a state-owned company owned by the Government of Buenos Aires Province, which also manages most routes to the cities of Costa Atlántica.

== History ==
The origins of this road go back to the Plan Director para Capital Federal y lineamientos estructurales para el Area Metropolitana y su región (Directing Plan for Capital Federal and structural guidelines for the metropolitan area and region) written by Buenos Aires City Hall between 1958 and 1965, where they describe, among others, a coastal highway between the cities of Tigre and La Plata.

The road planned after studies done starting in 1964 was accepted as it required the least expropriations.

As the roadbed coincided in part with Acceso Sudeste which was a federally administered road, when defining the routing of the Autopista Buenos Aires–La Plata, the Federal Department of Public Works (Secretaría de Estado de Obras Públicas de la Nación) and the Buenos Aires Province Ministry of Public Works (Ministerio de Obras Públicas de la Provincia de Buenos Aires) took part in the discussions and planning.

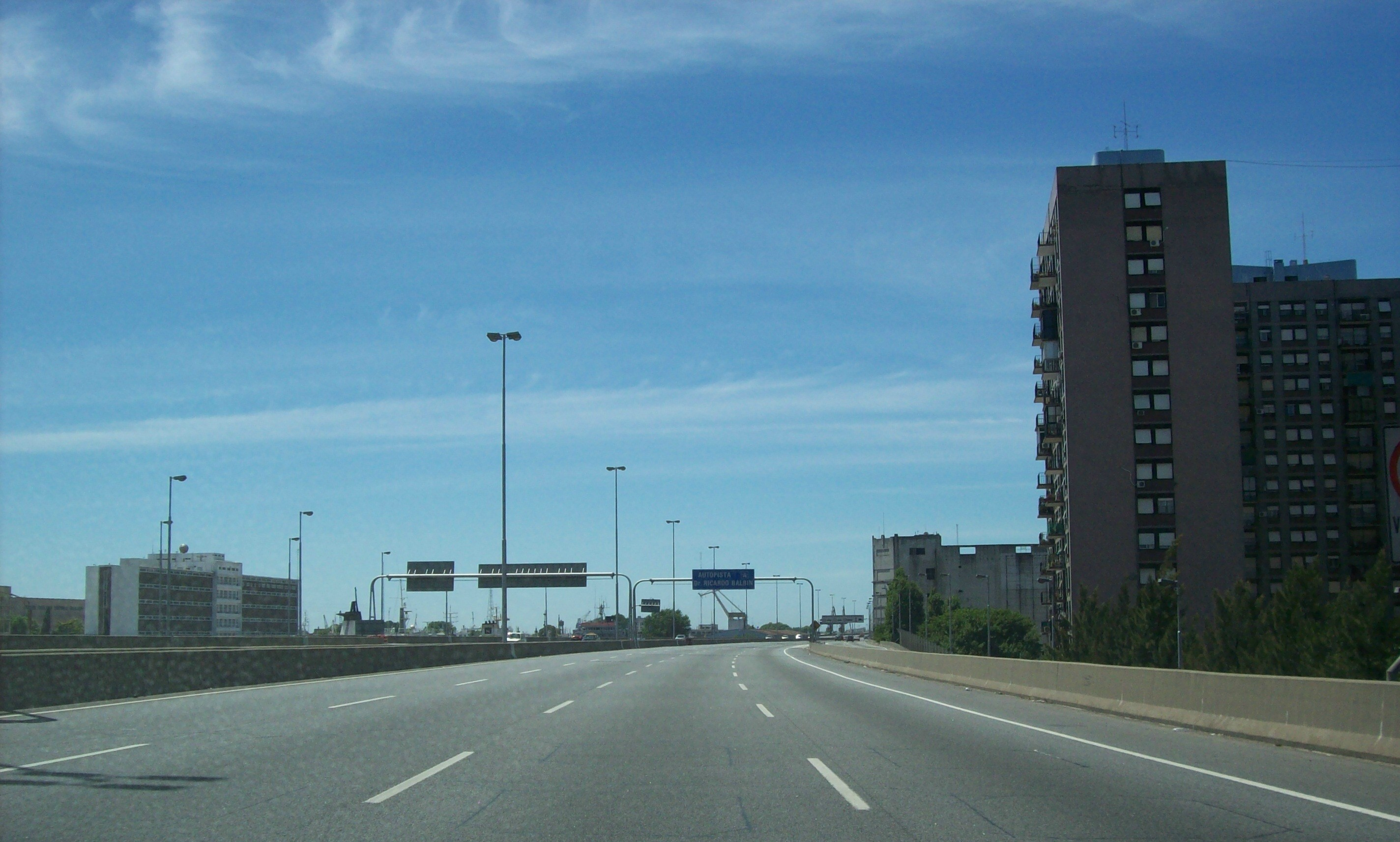
Autopista Buenos Aires - La Plata southbound in La Boca neighborhood

The project was presented for its eventual bidding on 3 August 1967. Although this project had been included in the Trienal Road Plan 1968–1970, the bidding did not take place.

On 29 March 1979 the national Department of Transportation and its provincial counterpart signed an agreement were both entities would call for a joint bidding for the construction and widening of the Buenos Aires–La Plata highway, dividing it in three sections: the first between the neighborhoods of La Boca and Hudson, including the bridge over the Riachuelo, the second between Hudson and La Plata and the last one from the junction near Martín García Avenue until 9 July Avenue. This agreement was ratified by Provincial decree 9343.

On 30 March 1980 the Concesionaria Vial Argentino-Española (Coviares) company won the bid and obtained the work permits after signing a contract on 2 January 1983. This contract, with state subsidies was re-negotiated several times until September 1994, when the project was added to the Red de Accesos a Buenos Aires (Buenos Aires Access Roads) plan, replacing the state subsidy with an extension of the concession to 22 years.

After several stops and starts, on 1 July 1995 the Buenos Aires - Quilmes section was opened to traffic. On 17 November of the same year the connection with Provincial Route 36 in Juan María Gutiérrez was completed, (road that connects to the southeast of Buenos Aires province). Finally, on 24 May 2002 the section from Hudson to Provincial Route 11 was completed.

The original concession contract included the construction of a coastal highway that would join this road with the Autopista Illia going through Puerto Madero and Retiro, in Buenos Aires city, but it was never built.

On 17 July 2004, Congress changed its name to Doctor Ricardo Balbín by law #25912 to commemorate the leader of the Unión Cívica Radical.

In November 2005 work was started to add a third lane on each direction between Acceso Sudeste and Quilmes (10 km (6 mi)) but work was stopped and not resumed. Record set on Buenos Aires - La plata highway in 2015 by Juan Ignacio Chiusaroli at 15:25, averaging 205.25 km/h.

=== Old road ===
Before 1979 Nacional Route 1 was placed farther aways from the Río de la Plata, as seen in the green line. The Avellaneda–Gutiérrez section run on the old National Route 2, the continued parallel to the Ferrocarril General Roca railroad until joining Camino General Belgrano, then following to the provincial capital.

Through Law #1595 of 1979 the road was transferred to provincial control. Buenos Aires Province took over in 1988, so the section northeast of Juan María Gutiérrez roundabout is now part of Provincial Route 36, while the 28 km (17 mi) southeast of the circle up until 32nd Street in La Plata, is part of Provincial Route 1.

== Major intersections ==
Partido	Km	Road / Int.	Notes
CABA	0	AU1 (Note: 25 de Mayo Highway.)	To Buenos Aires (north)
CABA	0	Paseo del Bajo	To Dellepiane Ave. / Perito Moreno Highway (east)
Avellaneda	7	Toll barrier	–
Quilmes	17	Calle 225	to Bernal (west) and Río de la Plata (east)
Quilmes	20	Otamendi Ave.	To Quilmes (west) and Río de la Plata (east)
Quilmes	21	Isidoro Iriarte Ave.	To Quilmes (west) and Río de la Plata (east)
Berazategui	26	Toll barrier	–
Berazategui	32	NR A004	to J.M. Gutiérrez Roundabout (west)
Ensenada	41		To Villa Elisa (west) and Río de la Plata (east)
La Plata	53	Provincial Route 11 (Buenos Aires)	To Punta Lara (north) and Mar del Sur (south)

== Petrol stations ==
- km 13: YPF (both sides)
- km 36: Shell (southbound)
- km 48: Shell (northbound)
