= Berazategui =

City in Buenos Aires Province, Argentina

- City
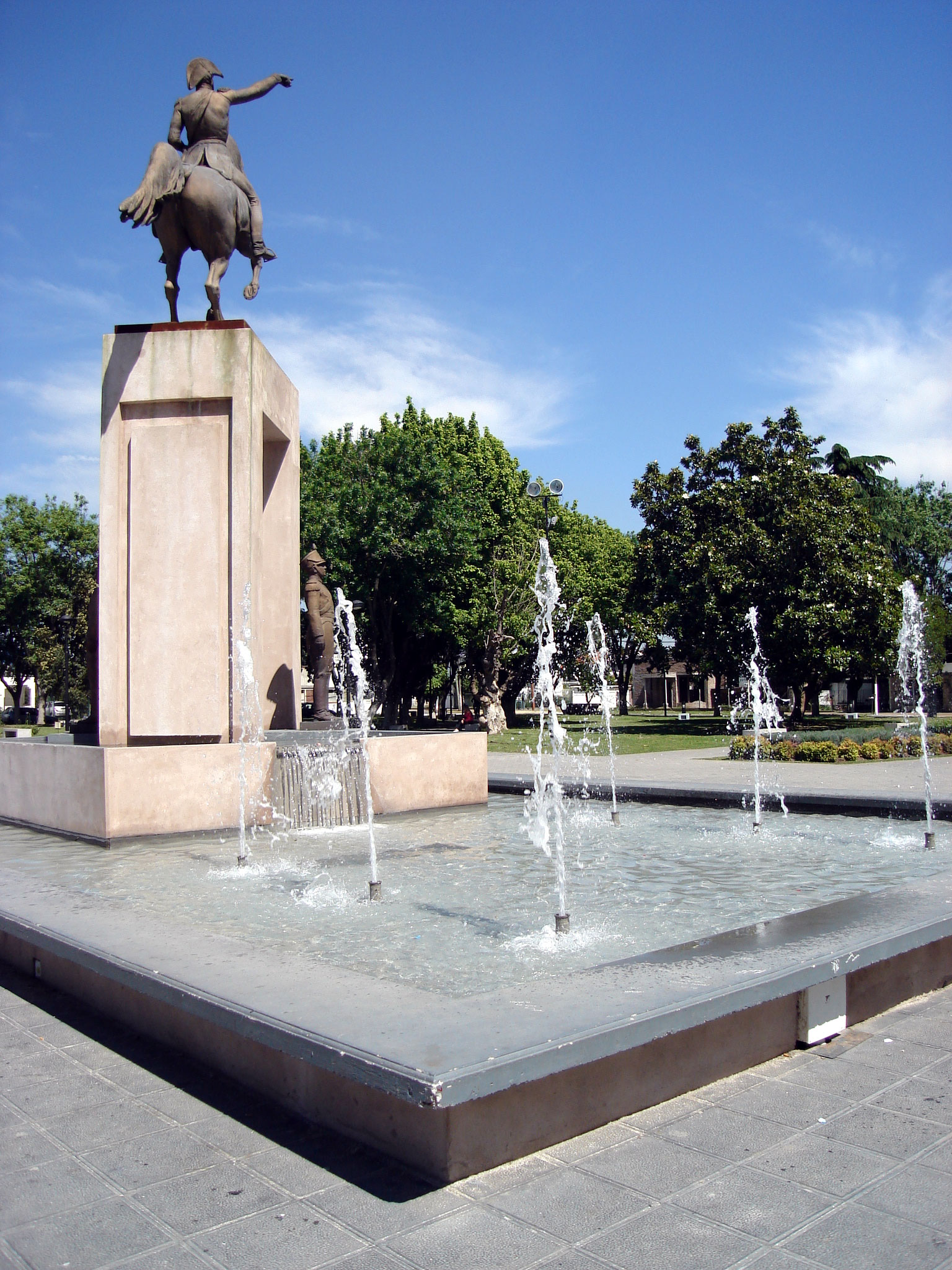

- Location in Greater Buenos Aires
- Coordinates: 34°43′S 58°15′W
- Country: Argentina
- Province: Buenos Aires Province
- Partido: Berazategui
- Founded: 1856
- Elevation: 22 m (72 ft)

Population (2022 census [INDEC])
  - Total: 188,380
  - Density: 7,264/km^{2} (18,810/sq mi)
- CPA Base: B 1880 & B 1884
- Area code: +54 11
- Climate: Cfa

Berazategui is a city in Buenos Aires Province, Argentina. It is the head town of the Berazategui Partido and is part of the Greater Buenos Aires metropolitan area. It is nicknamed "Capital Nacional del Vidrio" (National Capital of Glass), because of the high concentration of glassmaking industries in the area.

== History ==
Berazategui was the property of the Barragán family until 1860 when it was bought by José Clemente Berazategui and Juan Etcheverry, who establishes cattle ranches on the land. A meatpacking plant was established in 1890 for the production of beef.

In 1906, Gastón Fourvel Rigolleau purchased one hundred thousand square metres of land in the south of Greater Buenos Aires area from José Clemente Berasategui to expand his glass making enterprise, as the company's main customer, the Quilmes brewery, was situated in the neighbourhood. He set up three new factories for the manufacture of glass, along with warehouses and a tramline from Quilmes to Berazategui. This transformed the agriculture dependent economy of the Greater Buenos Aires area into an industrial one, employing more than 1,500 workers, including immigrants.

== Geography ==
Berazategui is part of the Buenos Aires Province and is the head town of the Berazategui Partido. It is located along the Río de la Plata esturay. The municipality of Berazategui was established in 1960.

== Demographics ==
According to the 2022 census conducted by the Instituto Nacional de Estadística y Censos (INDEC), the city of Berazategui recorded 358,328 inhabitants. The population increased from 324,156 inhabitants in 2010. The population include 173,130 males and 185,198 females. About 22.5% of the population were below the age of fourteen. About 81.4% of the inhabitants were recorded as born locally, with 4.2% foreign immigrants.

== Economy ==
The city has been nicknamed "Capital Nacional del Vidrio" (National Capital of Glass), because of the high concentration of glass making industries in the area. It was declared as the National Capital of the Glass in 1992. The city hosts a glass school and museum.
