= Hudson, Argentina =

Coordinates: 34.7903°S 58.1486°W

Hudson
- Interactive map of Hudson
- Country: Argentina
- Province: Buenos Aires
- Partido: Berazategui

Guillermo Enrique Hudson is a semi-rural town in Berazategui Partido (department) of Buenos Aires province, Argentina.

The town is named after writer William Henry Hudson using the Spanish translation of his name.

It has road and rail links to both Buenos Aires and La Plata. The Hudson segment of the toll road linking both cities gained notoriety in 2000 when a car accident next to a toll booth killed singer Rodrigo.
