= Avenida General Paz =

Highway in Argentina

Coordinates: 34.55739°S 58.503617°W

National Route A001
- Ruta nacional A001
- Avenida General Paz

Route information
- Maintained by Autopistas del Sol
- Length: 32 km (20 mi)
- Existed: 1941–present

Major junctions
- Beltway around Buenos Aires
- West end: Almirante Brown Avenue and Pinzón Street
- East end: Avenida Leopoldo Lugones

Location
- Country: Argentina

Highway system
- Highways in Argentina

The Avenida General Paz is a 24.3 km long highway in the Autonomous City of Buenos Aires, Argentina. The route starts at Avenida Lugones near the Río de la Plata and ends at the Puente de la Noria over the Matanza-Riachuelo River, which is essentially the boundary between the Autonomous City of Buenos Aires and the Province of Buenos Aires. Beyond the bridge at La Noria, it continues southeast as a popular route called Camino Negro, which is another highway. It is used as a route to access the City of Buenos Aires from the residents of the northern and western areas of Greater Buenos Aires, as well as from vehicles traveling to and from the north and west of the country.

Avenida General Paz is the land communication route with the highest volume of traffic among all national routes in the country, except for a short part of Route 9 between this route and the Camino de Cintura.

During its path, several large shopping centers and sites of interest can be found, such as Tecnópolis, the shopping center Dot Baires Shopping, the Children's Park, Sarmiento Park, Autódromo Oscar y Juan Gálvez and Club Atlético Platense.

In the road network, it is part of National Route A001, together with the Southeast Access and the viaduct of the Nicolás Avellaneda Bridge. The maintenance of Avenida General Paz was conceded in contract until 2020 to the company Autopistas del Sol. It is considered free because it does not have toll booths; however, the costs are covered by the toll booths on the North Access.

Its origins date back to National Law 2089 of 1887, which established the new boundaries of the Capital, incorporating the districts of Flores and Belgrano, determining that "at the circumference of the city, a boulevard 100 meters wide should be built. Initially, it was conceived as a park avenue, and the construction work was carried out between 1937 and 1941. After several reforms, it was converted into a highway between 1997 and 2000. It bears the name of the Cordoban military officer José María Paz.

== History ==
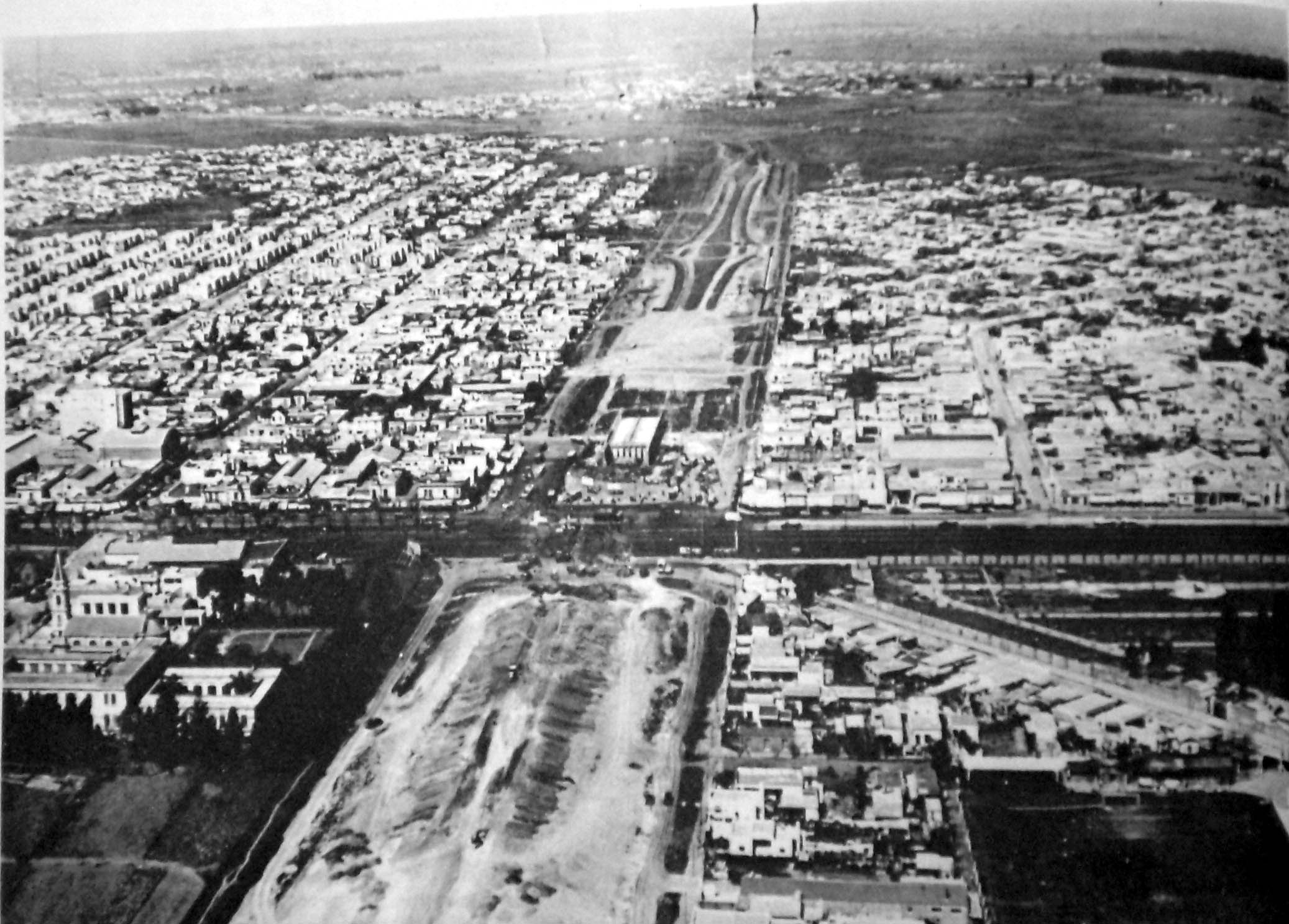
The ring road under construction c.1940.

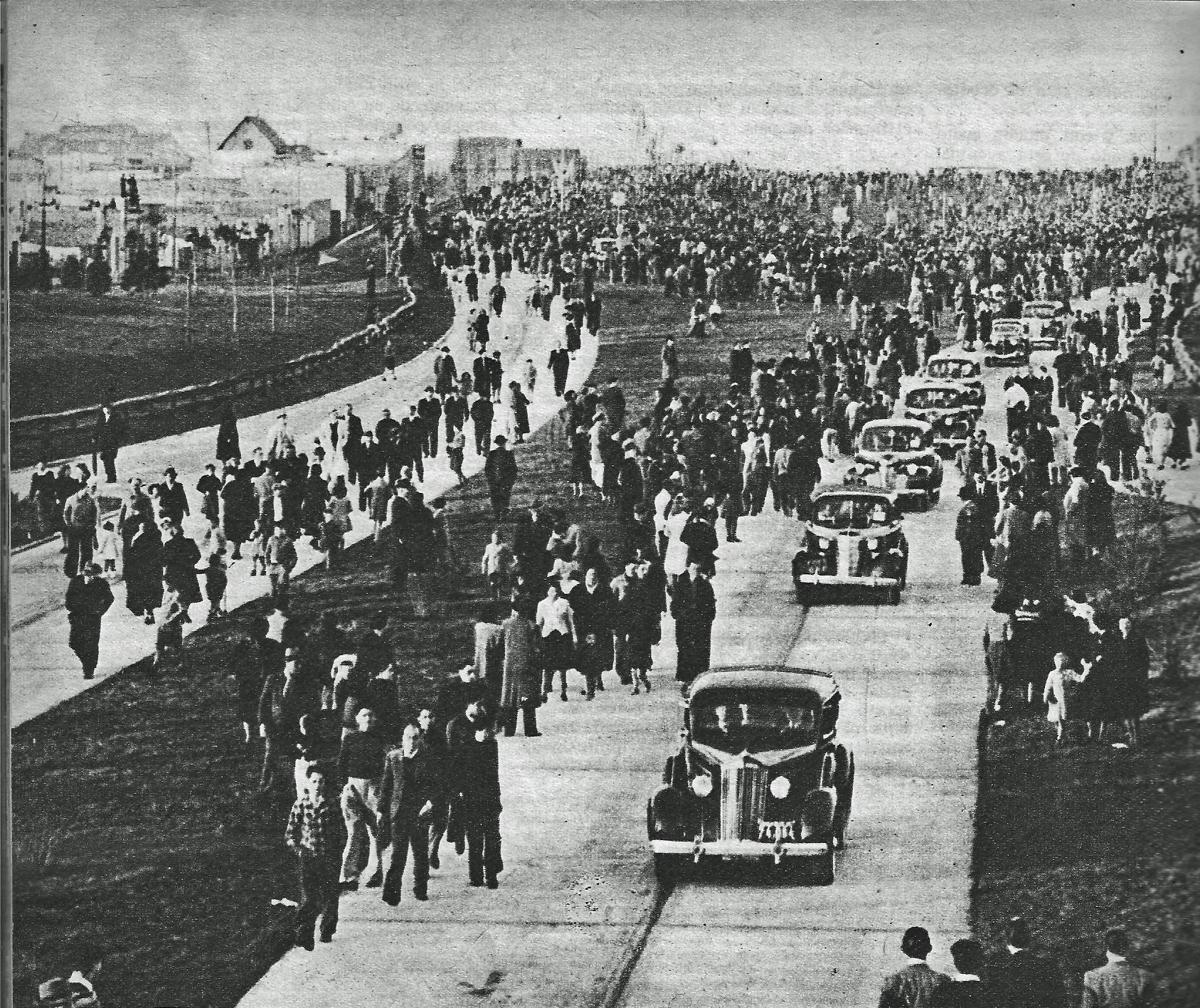
Inauguration in 1941.

Federal law number 2,089 of 1887 established the limits of the city of Buenos Aires, including the partidos of Belgrano and the former San José de Flores (now Barrio Flores). In Article 6 of that law it declared that a road was to be built to delimit these with the city of Buenos Aires. Due to the plan of drawing straight lines for the road, an exchange of land was made between the Autonomous City of Buenos Aires and Buenos Aires Province.

Named after José María Paz, the freeway was designed by Pascual Palazzo and construction was directed by José María Zaballa Carbó. It was the first freeway built in the country. The crossings with the most important avenues were grade-separated; more minor cross-streets were served with traffic circles. The road had four lanes, two on each direction and lateral feeder streets of one lane on each side. The pavement was made of reinforced concrete.

Works started on 8 June 1937, completed in two stages, the first from Riachuelo to Liniers (to Ramón Falcón street). The second stage extended from Liniers to Río de la Plata. Works were supervised by Dirección Nacional de Vialidad (the National office that controlled the routes in the country) and carried out by three private companies, "Empresa Argentina de Cemento Armado", "Compañía de Construcciones Civiles S.A.", and "Empresa Sabaría y Garassino Ltda.". The route was the first highway in Argentina with a cost of m$n 24 million, and officially inaugurated on July 5, 1941.

In the 1970s the roundabout on Avenida del Libertador was replaced by an interchange.

In 1996 the road was modernized and fully grade-separated, widening the road to three lanes on each direction and two feeder streets with two lanes each. To facilitate traffic it was decided that the colectivo bus lines travelled on these feeder roads, except the express service buses, which stop on these feeders. These streets have speed bumps that limit speed to 40 kilometers per hour (25 mph).

== Gallery ==
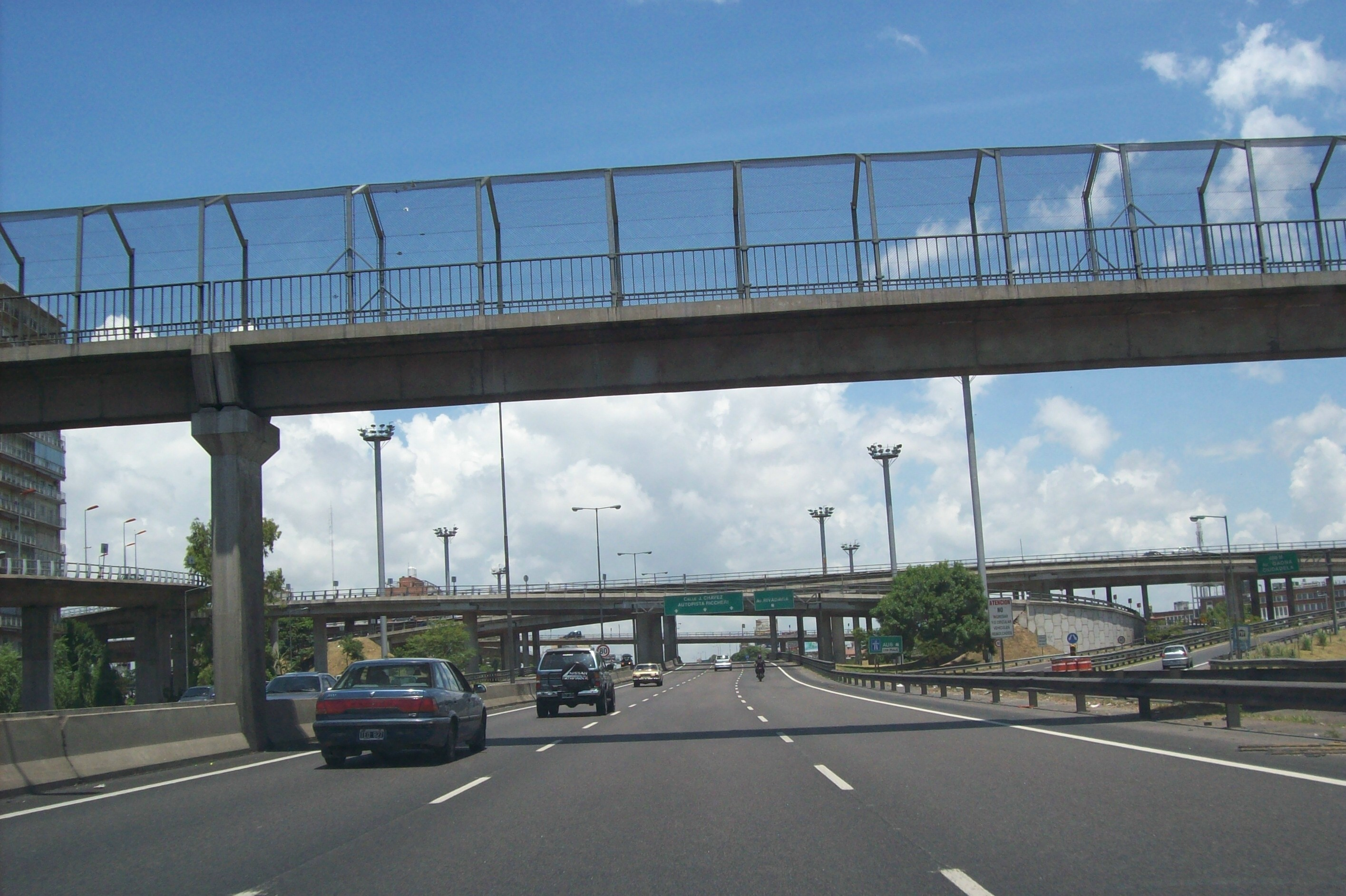
The expressway at its junction with Highway 7

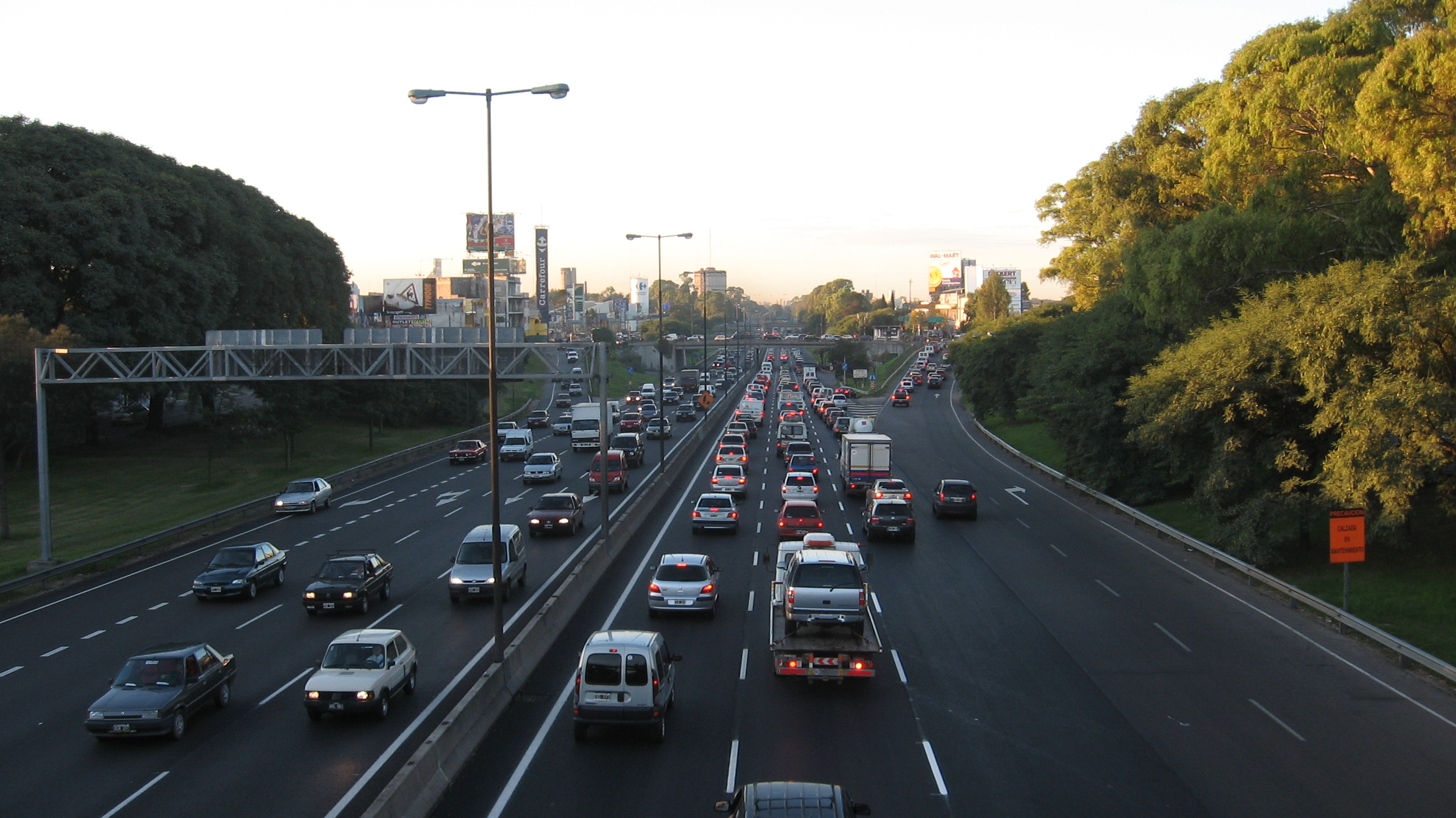
Avenida General Paz at its San Martín Avenue exit

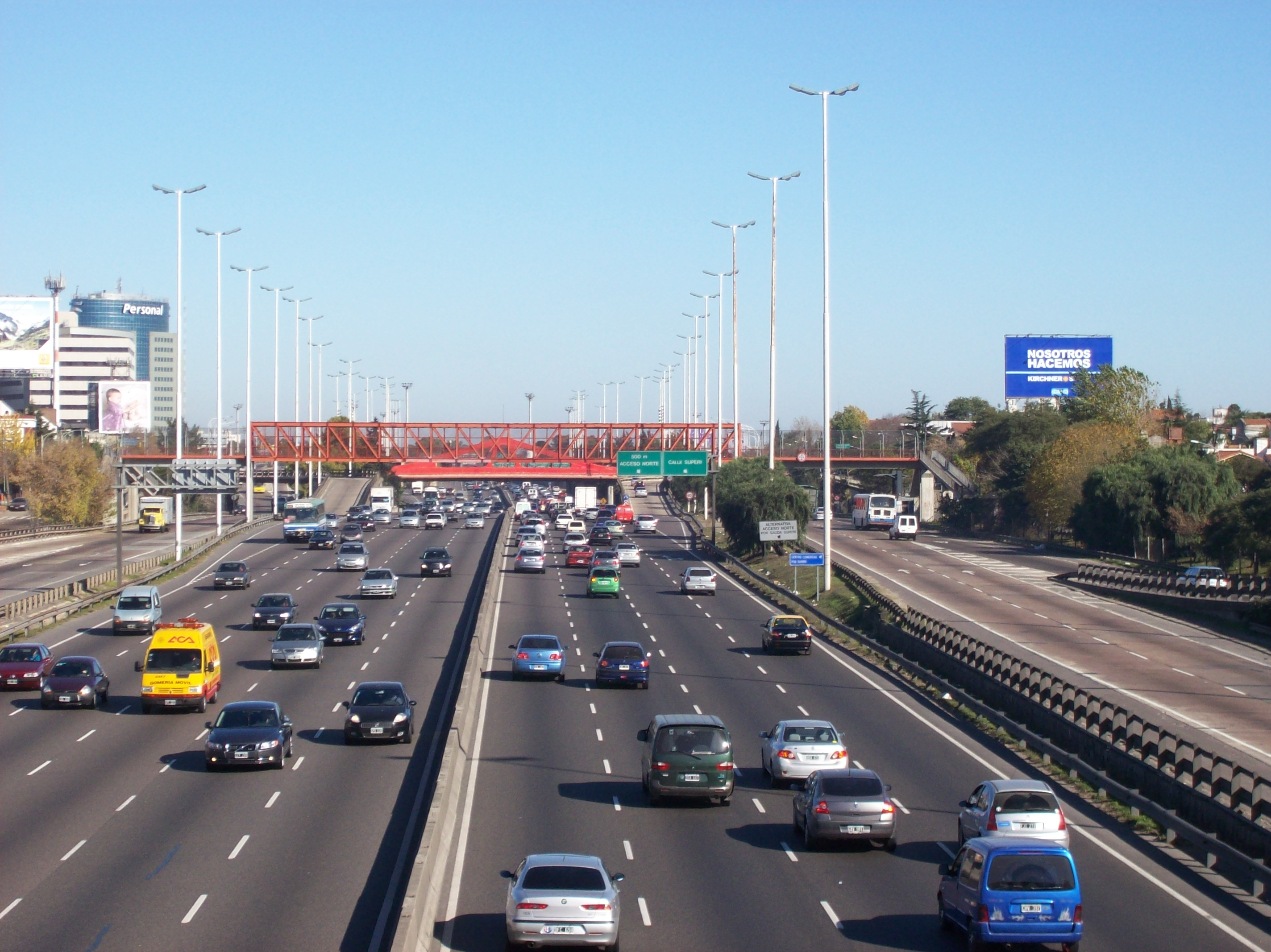
