= Berazategui Partido =

Berazategui Partido de Berazategui
- Department
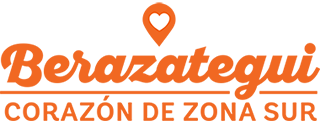
- Logo

- Berazategui Partido in relation to Gran Buenos Aires
- Coordinates: 34°47′S 58°24′W
- Country: Argentina
- Province: Buenos Aires
- Established: 1960
- Founder: provincial law
- Seat: Berazategui

Government
  - Intendant: Carlos Balor (Partido Justicialista)

Area
  - Total: 188 km^{2} (73 sq mi)

Population
  - Total: 320,224
  - Density: 1,700/km^{2} (4,410/sq mi)
- Demonym: berazateguense
- Postal Code: B1880, B1884, B1885, B1886, B1890, B1893
- IFAM: BUE013
- Area Code: 011, 02229
- Website: www.berazategui.gov.ar

Berazategui is a partido in Buenos Aires Province, Argentina. With an area of 188 km^{2} (73 sq mi) and a population of 320,224 (2010 census [INDEC]), it is at the southeast of the Greater Buenos Aires urban conglomerate, and its capital is Berazategui city.

It was part of the Quilmes Partido until 1960.

The majority of the population are concentrated in the city of Berazategui, which has an important commercial district with a pedestrian centre.

Berazategui is also home to Asociación Deportiva Berazategui, a football club that play in the regionalised 4th division of Argentine football.

== Settlements ==
- Berazategui (capital)
- El Pato
- Juan María Gutiérrez
- Ranelagh
- Sourigues
- Pereyra
- Plátanos
- Villa España
- Hudson
