= Bosch Bridge =

Bosch Bridge Puente Bosch
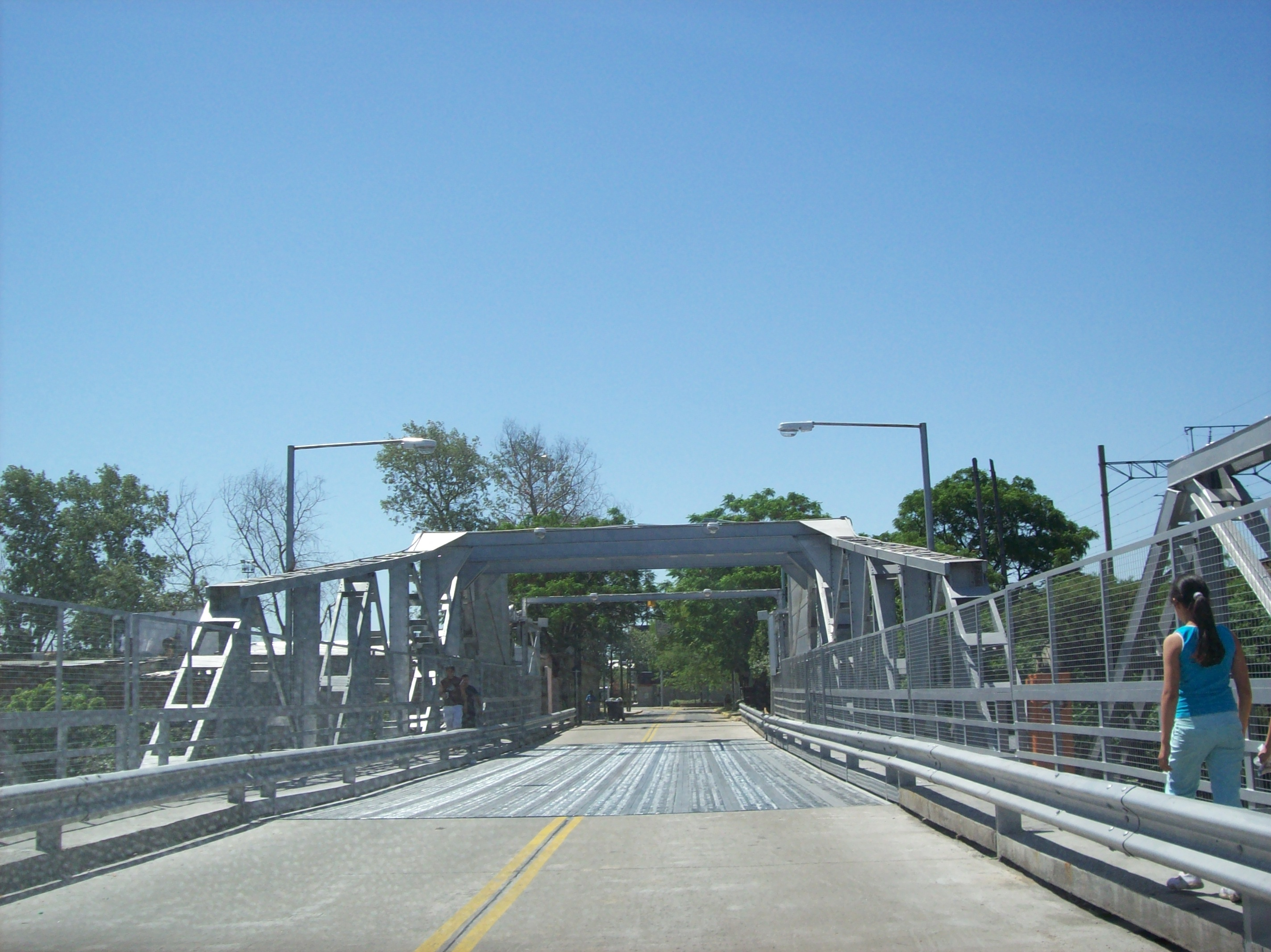
- View of the bridge from the south, 2008.
- Coordinates: 34°39′27″S 58°22′41.62″W
- Carries: Vehicles, bicycle, pedestrians
- Crosses: Matanza River
- Locale: Buenos Aires Province
- Owner: City of Buenos Aires
- Maintained by: City of Buenos Aires

Characteristics
- Material: Iron

History
- Inaugurated: July 30, 1908; 118 years ago

Location
- Interactive map of Bosch Bridge

The Bosch Bridge is a bascule bridge in Buenos Aires, Argentina, that connects the Algarrobo street in Barracas neighborhood with the Barrio Piñeyro of Avellaneda Partido, crossing over Matanza River (popularly known as Riachuelo). The bridge carries vehicular, bicycle, and pedestrian traffic between both points.

The bridge extends parallel to the General Roca Railway rail tracks between Hipólito Yrigoyen and Darío Santillán y Maximiliano Kosteki stations. Its structure is made of iron and was inaugurated on July 30, 1908.

On July 12, 1930, at 6:05 am, an electric tram going to Lanús fell into the Riachuelo river after the driver ran straight without seeing the red light warning about the leaf raised due to the thick fog. 56 of a total of 60 passengers died, most of them working class people going to their jobs.

The tramway accident was mentioned on Sherlock Time, a comic strip by writer Héctor Oesterheld and artist Alberto Breccia published in Hora Cero magazine. In the story, a group of relatives of the victims joined to recreate the accident and then sue the tram company. Nevertheless, Sherlock Time rescued them alive after realising it was a trap from a group of aliens to capture them.

In 2001 the Bosch Bridge was closed because of its deterioration. The bridge was then refurbished by the Public Works Ministry of the City of Buenos Aires, which took charge of its maintenance. The bridge was re-opened to the public in June 2008, with height and weight restrictions for the vehicles (4.10 m and 12 tons respectively). Works had a cost of A$ 3,2 million.

In September 2015 there was a proposal to adapt the Bosch Bridge for pedestrian use exclusively. The project was named "Puente de las Mariposas" ("Butterflies Bridge"), connecting the Design Metropolitan Center of Barracas with the Faculty of Environmental Sciences of Avellaneda.

== See also ==
- Pueyrredón Bridge
- New Pueyrredón Bridge
