= Avellaneda =

- City
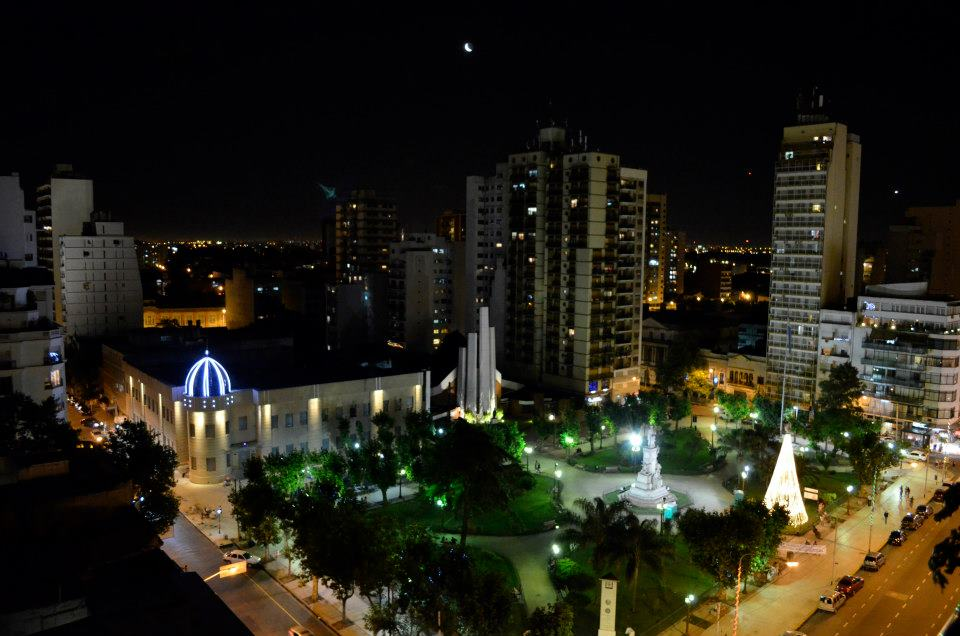
- Avellaneda

- Coat of arms

- Location in Greater Buenos Aires
- Coordinates: 34°39′45″S 58°22′04″W
- Country: Argentina
- Province: Buenos Aires
- Partido: Avellaneda
- Founded: April 7, 1852

Area
  - Total: 55 km^{2} (21 sq mi)
- Elevation: 2 m (6.6 ft)

Population (2022 census [INDEC])
  - Total: 367,554
  - Density: 6,700/km^{2} (17,000/sq mi)
- CPA Base: B 1870
- Area code: +54 11
- Climate: Cfa
- Website: www.mda.gob.ar

Avellaneda (Latin American Spanish: [aβeʝaˈneða], locally [aβeʃaˈneða]) is a port city in the province of Buenos Aires, Argentina, and the seat of the Avellaneda Partido, whose population was 367,554 as per the 2022 census [INDEC]. Avellaneda is located within the Greater Buenos Aires metropolitan area, and is connected to neighboring Buenos Aires by several bridges over the Riachuelo River.

== Overview ==
Located on land granted to Adelantado Juan Torres de Vera y Aragón by Captain Juan de Garay in 1620, a port settlement known as Puerto del Riachuelo first emerged here in 1731. Established as Barracas al Sur on April 7, 1852, by Quilmes Justice of the Peace Martín José de la Serna, the town grew to become a major rail center during the late 19th century. It was renamed on January 11, 1904, after former President Nicolás Avellaneda. It was declared a city on October 23, 1895, and its population has been stable since around 1960.

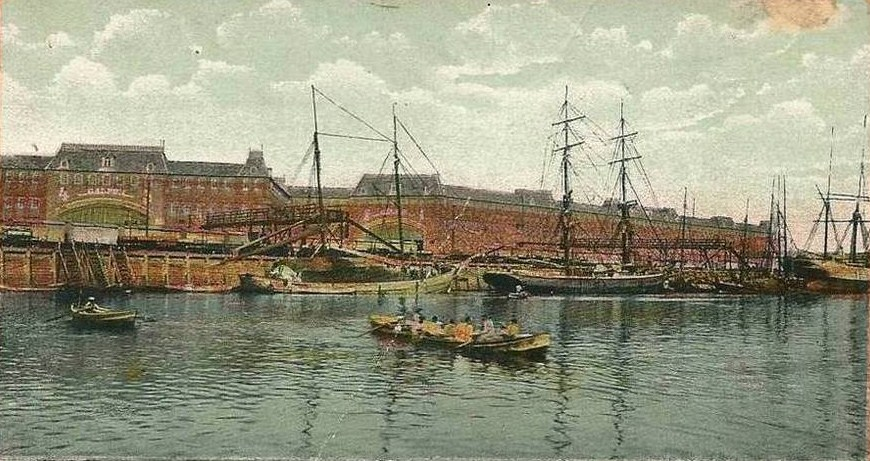
The Central Produce Market, the nation's largest wholesaler from 1889 until its closure in 1963.

Avellaneda is one of the foremost wholesale and industrial centers of Argentina. The city's largest employers are textile mills, meat-packing and grain-processing plants, oil refineries, metallurgical works, extensive docking facilities, and markets for farm and ranch products; some of the most prominent firms whose main facilities are in Avellaneda are food processor Molinos Río de la Plata, beverage maker Cepas Argentinas, bathroom fixtures maker Ferrum, and América 24 cable news. The National University of Avellaneda was established here in 2009.

The Central Produce Market (Mercado Central de Frutos) also operated in Avellaneda. Located on the banks of the Riachuelo, it was developed by Irish Argentine businessman Eduardo Casey and inaugurated in 1889; served by a Buenos Aires Western Railway rail link, the 150,000 m^{2} (1,600,000 sq ft) brick structure was at the time the largest warehouse in the world. The decentralization of warehousing and wholesaling during the 20th century, as well as its nationalization in 1946 as part of the IAPI state export agency, resulted in its decline, however, and the Central Produce Market closed in 1963. It was ultimately demolished in 1966 to make way for the New Pueyrredón Bridge that connects Avellaneda to the Frondizi Expressway in Buenos Aires proper.

== Travel ==
The main thoroughfare is the Presidente Bartolomé Mitre Avenue, which begins at the New Pueyrredón Bridge and ends at Triángulo de Bernal. This bridge carries the heaviest traffic between Avellaneda and the City of Buenos Aires, as it merges onto the 9 de Julio Avenue. The bridge also intersects with the Hipólito Yrigoyen Avenue (formerly Pavón Avenue) towards the southwest, which connects several departments (i.e. Lanús, Lomas de Zamora, Almirante Brown, Presidente Perón and San Vicente).

Darío Santillán y Maximiliano Kosteki Station on the Roca Line is located in Avellaneda.

== Tourism ==
Centro Municipal de Arte (Municipal Art Centre): Located at San Martín 797, is a two-story building with five exhibition halls, workshop spaces, recording studios, and a central multimedia room dedicated to performances. It has a schedule of exhibitions formed mainly by artists from Avellaneda, which are renewed every month.

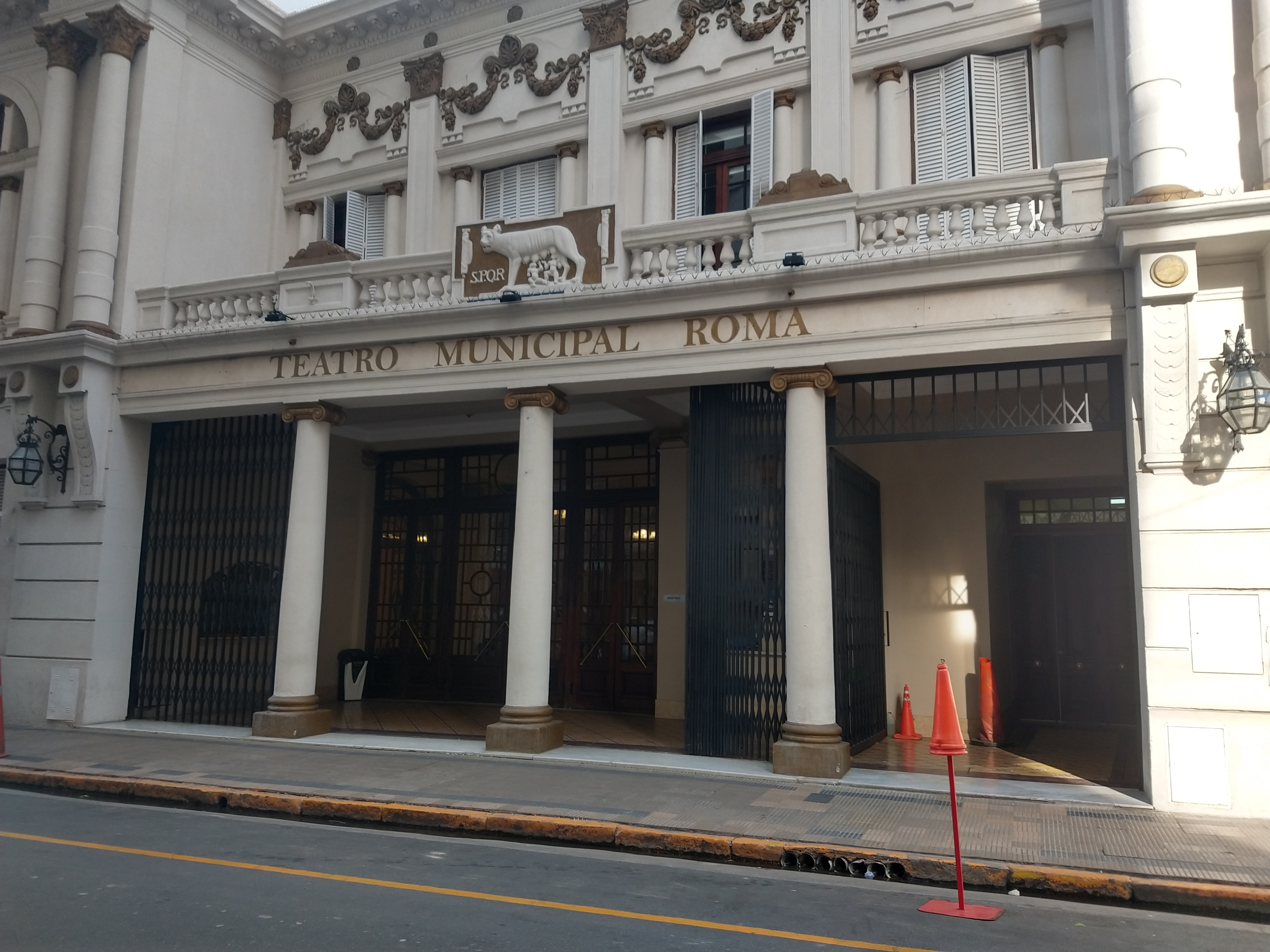
Municipal Theater "Roma" 2025

Parque Multipropósito "La Estación" ("La Estacion" Multipurpose Fair): Located at General Güemes 700, is a four-hectare park on land formerly used by the Provincial Railway, which has been reclaimed as a space for interaction and fun, with facilities such as playgrounds, a 300-square-meter dog park, a 550-meter bike path, green areas for walking and relaxing, and play and recreation areas for all ages.

Teatro Municipal "Roma" (Municipal Theater "Roma"): Located at Sarmiento 109, is a cultural and architectural gem, inaugurated on 10 October 1904, and where great figures such as Carlos Gardel, Lolita Torres, Miguel Ángel Estrella, Alfredo Alcón, Pepe Soriano, China Zorrilla, among others, performed. In recent years, the municipality has carried out a comprehensive restoration of the old theater.

Alto Avellaneda: Located at General Güemes 897 and formerly known as Alto Avellaneda Shopping Mall, was inaugurated on 11 November 1995. It is currently the main shopping center in the southern part of the Greater Buenos Aires area.

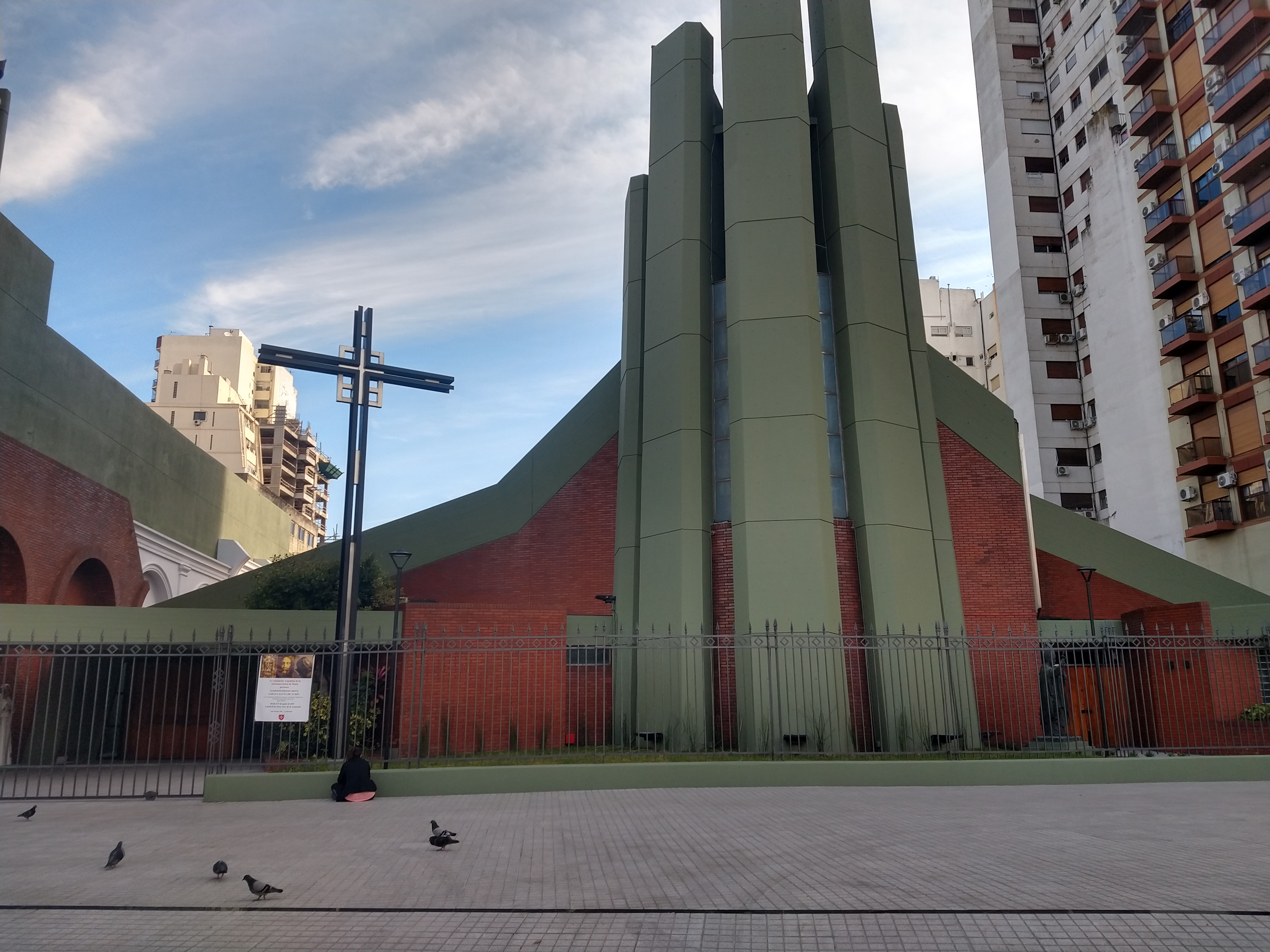
Cathedral "Nuestra Señora de la Asunsión" 2025

== Religion ==
The Diocese of Avellaneda and Lanús was formally established in 1961. Its cathedral, Iglesia Catedral de la Asunción, had been consecrated a century earlier. The construction of numerous high rises around Alsina Square during the 1950s and '60s led to irreparable structural damage to the cathedral, however, and in 1967 it was closed to the public. Demolished in 1971, the Renaissance Revival cathedral was replaced in 1984 by a modern structure.

== Sports ==
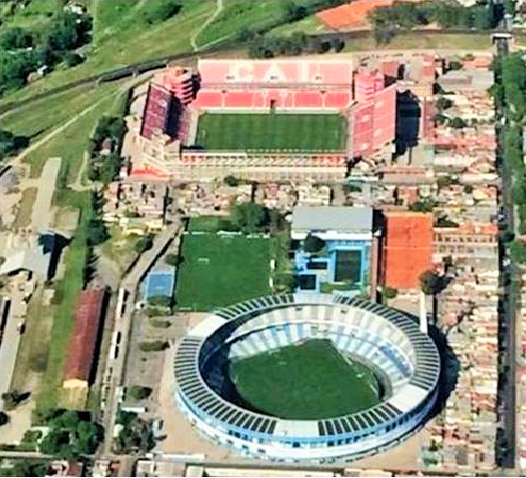
Aerial view of Libertadores de América and Presidente Perón Stadiums.

Two of the most important Argentine football clubs, Independiente and Racing, are located in Avellaneda. The city became the third in the world (after Milan and Montevideo) to be home to two world championship teams when Independiente won the 1973 Intercontinental Cup.

Avallaneda was declared the National Capital of Football, since it is the department that has the most football clubs in Argentina affiliated with AFA (i.e. Racing Club, C.A Independiente, Arsenal Fútbol Club, Club El Porvenir, Club Sportivo Dock Sud and Club Atlético Victoriano Arenas).

== People ==
See Category:People from Avellaneda

== Landmarks ==
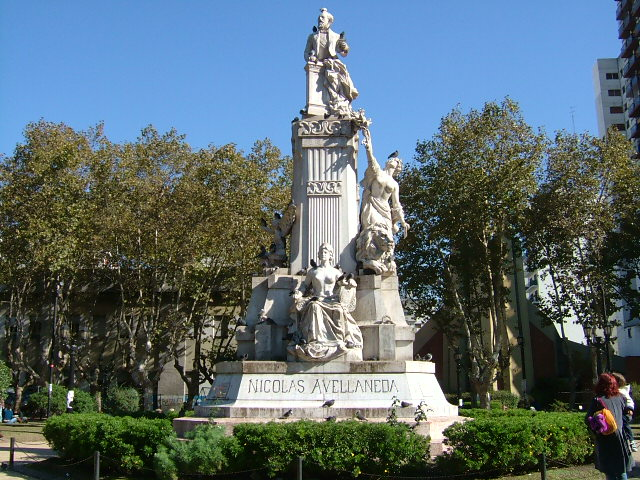
Monument to Nicolás Avellaneda on Alsina Square

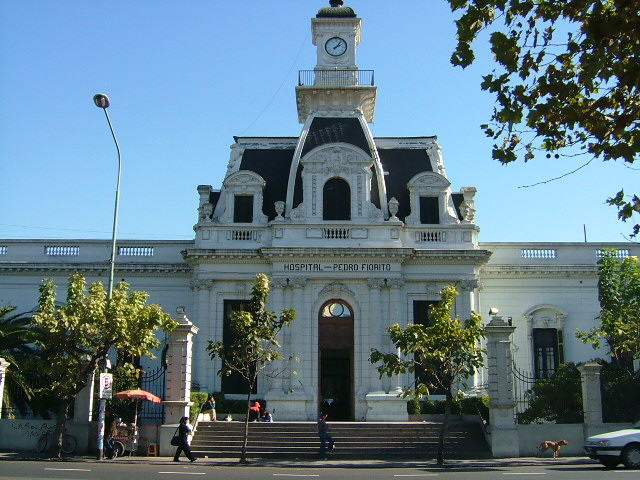
Pedro Fiorito Hospital

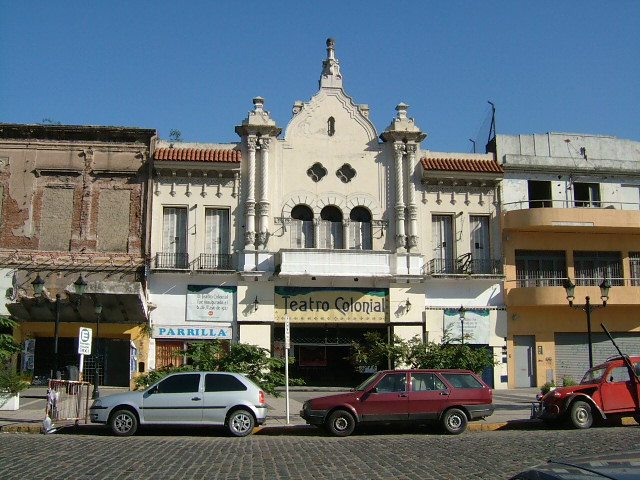
Colonial Theatre

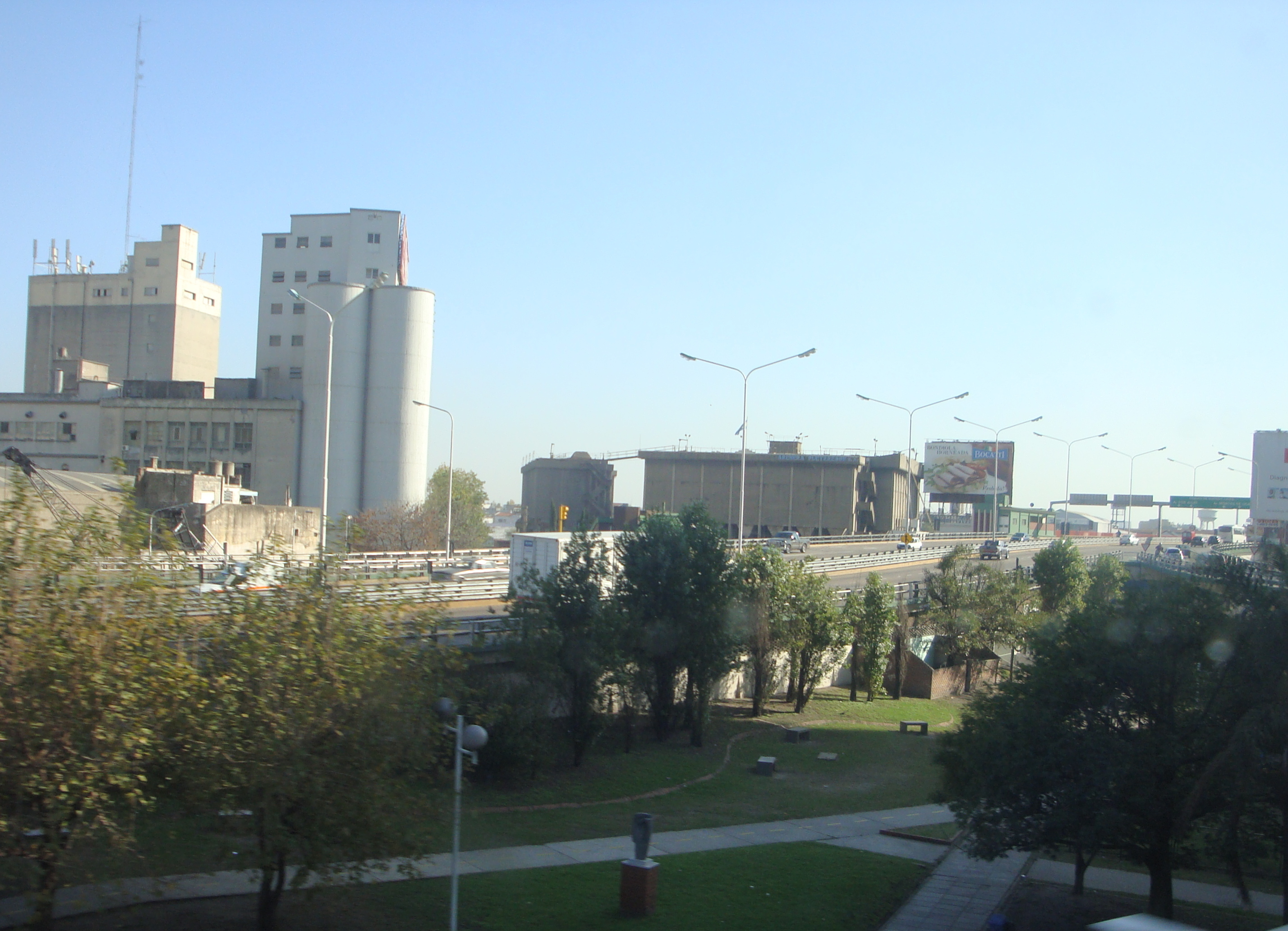
Pueyrredón Park

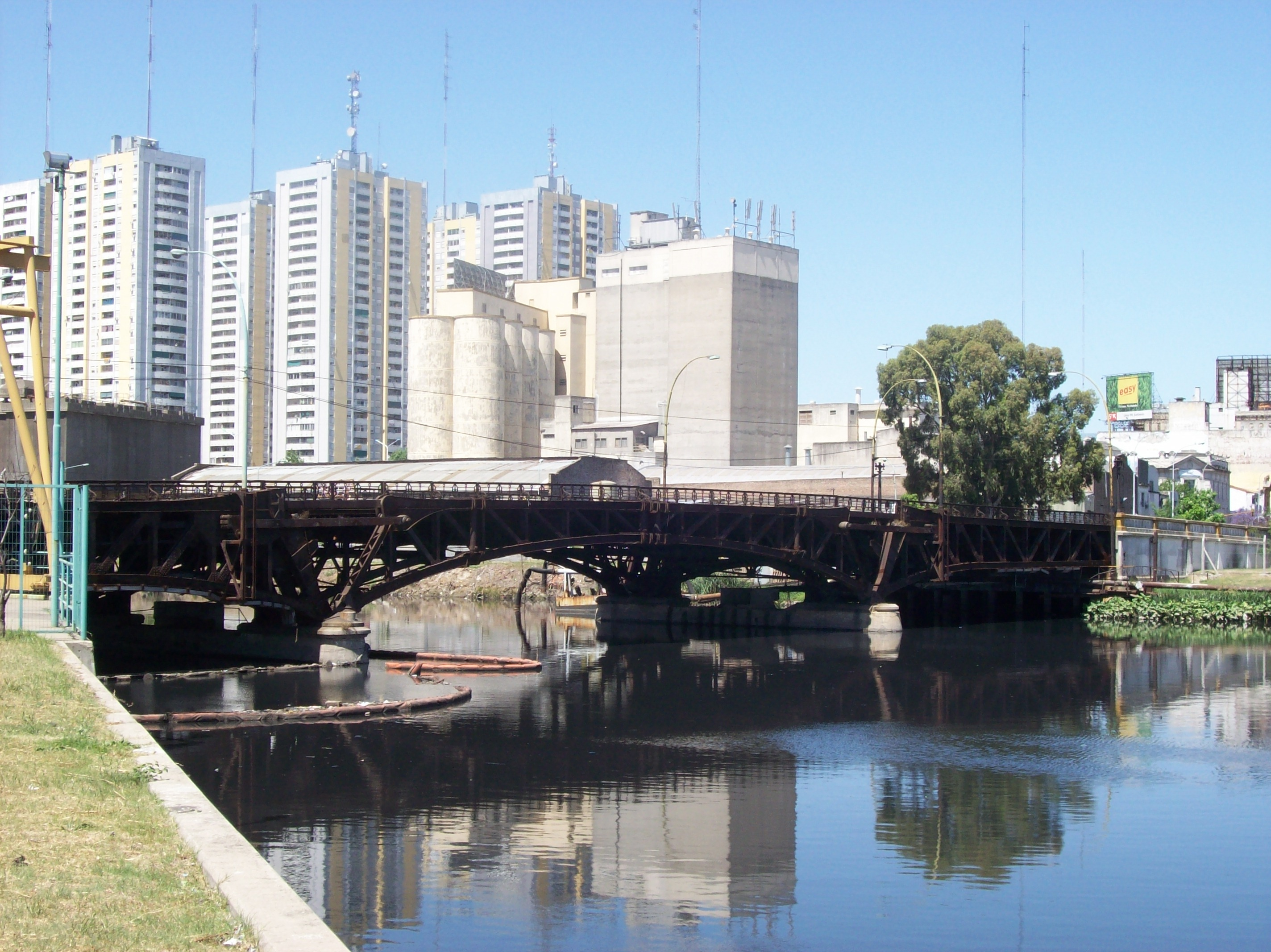
Pueyrredón Bridge

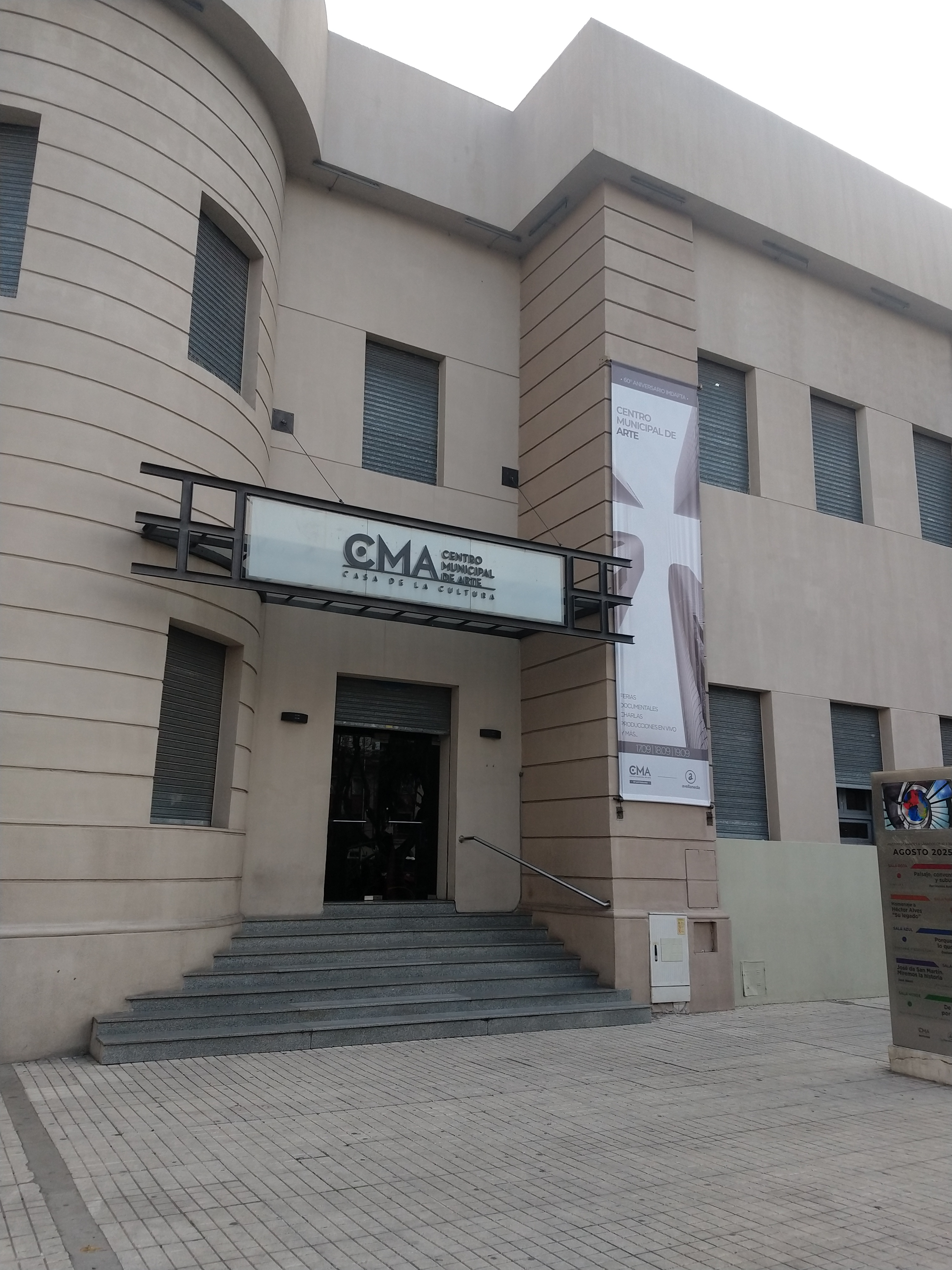
Municipal Art Centre

== See also ==
- Santa Ana, Santa Fe
