= Matías Gallegos =

Argentine footballer

Personal information
- Full name: Matías Gallegos Panozzo
- Date of birth: 15 May 1997 (age 29)
- Place of birth: Santa Ana, Argentina
- Height: 1.79 m (5 ft 10 1/2 in)
- Position: Forward

Team information
- Current team: Deportes Antofagasta

Youth career
- Tiro Federal Santa Ana
- Deportivo Santa Ana
- 2011–2018: Unión Santa Fe

Senior career*
Years	Team	Apps	(Gls)
2018–2023	Unión Santa Fe	30	(3)
2019	→ Olimpo (loan)	12	(4)
2019–2020	→ Estudiantes BA (loan)	17	(1)
2021	→ Chacarita Juniors (loan)	22	(0)
2023	→ Barnechea (loan)	25	(6)
2024	Barnechea	23	(7)
2025	Deportes Copiapó	28	(7)
2026–	Deportes Antofagasta	0	(0)
- * Club domestic league appearances and goals as of 12 February 2026

Matías Gallegos Panozzo (born 15 May 1997) is an Argentine professional footballer who plays as a forward for Chilean club Deportes Antofagasta.

== Career ==
He played for Tiro Federal de Santa Ana and Deportivo Santa Ana in his youth career, before joining Unión Santa Fe in 2011. Seven years later, Gallegos' senior career got underway with Unión Santa Fe. After being promoted into the first-team midway through the 2017–18 Primera División season, Gallegos scored on his professional debut on 31 March 2018. He featured for the final eleven minutes and netted the club's only goal in a 1–1 draw against San Martín. Five further appearances followed in all competitions in season one. In January 2019, Gallegos was loaned to Olimpo of Primera B Nacional.

Gallegos scored four goals for Olimpo, including a brace over Mitre on 24 March 2019. In the succeeding July, having returned to his parent club, Gallegos left on loan for a second time as he returned to the second tier with Estudiantes. He made his debut on 24 August against San Martín, the same opponents he'd score his only Estudiantes goal for in February 2020. Upon returning to Unión, the forward suffered a knee injury. In February 2021, Gallegos joined Chacarita Juniors on a one-year loan deal.

In February 2023, Gallegos joined Chilean club AC Barnechea on loan until the end of 2023.

In 2025, Gallegos signed with Deportes Copiapó. The next season, he switched to Deportes Antofagasta.

== Career statistics ==
As of 15 October 2020.

Club statistics
Club	Season	League			Cup		League Cup		Continental		Other		Total	
Club	Season	Division	Apps	Goals	Apps	Goals	Apps	Goals	Apps	Goals	Apps	Goals	Apps	Goals
Unión Santa Fe	2017–18	Primera División	5	1	1	0	—		—		0	0	6	1
Unión Santa Fe	2018–19	Primera División	3	0	0	0	0	0	0	0	0	0	3	0
Unión Santa Fe	2019–20	Primera División	0	0	0	0	0	0	0	0	0	0	0	0
Unión Santa Fe	Total		8	1	1	0	0	0	0	0	0	0	9	1
Olimpo (loan)	2018–19	Primera B Nacional	12	4	0	0	—		—		0	0	12	4
Estudiantes (loan)	2019–20	Primera B Nacional	17	1	2	0	—		—		0	0	19	1
Career total			37	6	3	0	0	0	0	0	0	0	40	6
