= Villa Domínico =

- City
- Location in Greater Buenos Aires
- Coordinates: 34°41′30″S 58°20′00″W
- Country: Argentina
- Province: Buenos Aires
- Partido: Avellaneda
- Founded: August 11, 1894
- Elevation: 6 m (20 ft)

Population (2010 census [INDEC])
  - Total: 62,315
- CPA Base: B 1874
- Area code: +54 11

Villa Domínico is a city in the Avellaneda Partido. Buenos Aires Province, Argentina. It belongs to the Greater Buenos Aires urban agglomeration.

== History ==
A 1580 expedition by Captain Juan de Garay, the founder of present-day Buenos Aires, resulted in land grants for an Adelantado, Torres de Vera, and a Regidor, Luis Gaitán. Melchor Maciel purchased the Gaitán heirs' land in 1619, and Maciel's widow, who remarried after his 1633 death, expanded her holdings to 24,000 hectares (60,000 acres). Following the death of their son, Luis Pesoa de Figueroa, in 1725, his widow divided the estate into four equal parcels. Juan Estanislao Zamudio purchased three of the lots, and the fourth was donated by the widow to the Roman Catholic Dominican Order, who established the Convent of Santo Domingo.

The Camino Real was extended south from Sarandí by order of the Real Consulado de Buenos Aires, and the pontoon bridge built to extend the road gave this area its first informal name: Paraje del Puente Chico (Little Bridge Outpost). Andrés Pazos bought much of the land in 1820, and his rural home was counted in the 1838 census of Buenos Aires Province commissioned by Governor Juan Manuel de Rosas. Patricio Brown installed the first industrial establishment, a salted meat maker, in 1850.

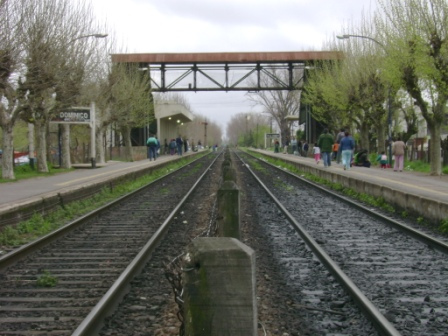
The Villa Domínico station

Jorge Domínico purchased the land in 1856. He sold a swath of land therein to the Buenos Aires and Ensenada Port Railway, which was completed in 1872. The first lots were sold to homesteaders on August 11, 1894. A neighboring landowner, Federico Gattemeyer, did likewise in 1908, and the Port Railway opened a station in Villa Domínico in 1909. Driven by a wave of immigration in Argentina, the settlement grew quickly, and by 1910, was home to around 1,100 inhabitants. The Villa Domínico Community Development and Mutual Aid Society was established on August 28, 1910, and by their initiative, the first fire house was opened in 1912. The Church of San José was consecrated on April 23, 1918.

The cities representative in the Provincial Legislature, Fabían Onzari, succeeded in having a comprehensive flood control plan enacted for the area in 1923, and the network of canals and ancillary works, known as the Onzari Plan, was completed in 1929. The city became a bedroom community with a services-oriented economy in subsequent decades.
