= Sarandí, Buenos Aires =

Sarandí
- City
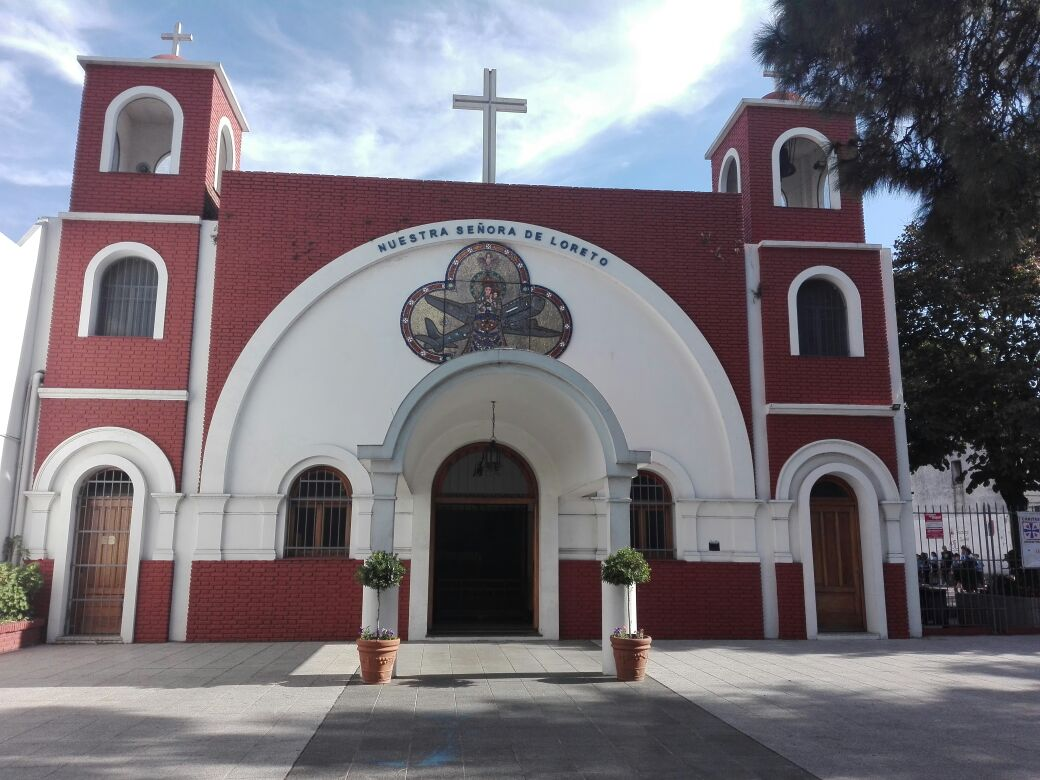
- Church of Our Lady of Loreto

- Location in Greater Buenos Aires
- Coordinates: 34°41′S 58°20′W
- Country: Argentina
- Province: Buenos Aires
- Partido: Avellaneda

Population (2001 census [INDEC])
  - Total: 60,752
- CPA Base: B 1872
- Area code: +54 11

Sarandí (Spanish pronunciation: [saɾanˈdi]) is a city in the Avellaneda Partido of the urban agglomeration of Greater Buenos Aires, Argentina. It is located to the south of the Autonomous City of Buenos Aires.

The city has an area of 54 square kilometres (21 sq mi) and a population of 60,752 inhabitants (INDEC, 2001); the second most populated locality in the partido after Avellaneda, with 18.5% of the partido's population. The main economical activity in the area is the production of leather goods. The leather industry, especially the tanning process, is often criticized for its contamination of the Riachuelo River.

The city was named after a native bush called sarandí (Cephalanthus glabratus).

== Sport ==
Sarandí is home to Arsenal de Sarandí, a football club that currently plays in Primera B, the third division.
