= Brian Palacio =

Independent Argentinian photojournalist

Brian Palacio is an independent Argentinian photojournalist who was arrested on 30 December 2013 while covering a protest and was brutally beaten and tortured by gendarmes.

== Attack of 30 December 2013 ==
Palacio, 25, was covering protests in Buenos Aires against power cuts on the evening of 30 December 2013 when he was apprehended by gendarmes and beaten for two hours.

According to accounts given by Palacio several days later to Clarin and to the Journalists' Union of Buenos Aires (UTPBA), he was going to the Pueyrredón Bridge and along the way he saw people protesting outside the Alto Avellaneda Shopping Center. He spoke to a couple of gendarmes who told him what was going on, namely that "some of the protesters had intimidated passersby and had assaulted members of the gendarmerie." The street was blacked out because of the power shortage, and the darkness caused confusion. He saw a pregnant woman being beaten up and motorcyclists being attacked. Palacio took a couple of pictures and was leaving when "a couple of gendarmerie vans arrived and identified people who had been taking part in the aggression." Palacio photographed the gendarmes beating people who had been stopping traffic. "They ran to look for them and I ran after them and took my equipment out again, took two pictures." They yelled: "Don't take pictures." After they had caught one of the protesters, they began to chase Palacio. At first he ran, but when he had managed to get away he decided to return to the site of the protest and show his good will by deleting the photographs he had taken. Despite his offer to delete the pictures, however, four gendarmes grabbed him and put him in the van. Several observers shouted: "Leave him alone! Don't take him!"

"They grabbed me, they beat me, they threw me into the truck and covered my head with the t-shirt I was wearing and put my head between my legs, they threatened me with death, threatened to throw me into the river, among other things. After a while they took me down to a vacant lot, I don't know where it was, they beat me up, they made me delete the photos I had in my camera, they threatened me, saying that they had my personal information and that if I denounced them they would seek me out at my house. Then they took me back to the van, they took me to another vacant lot and told me to count to a thousand, and when they left they put the wheel of a truck on top of my back so I couldn't get up."

The gendarmes took with them all of his equipment – a camera, lenses, flash equipment, a memory stick, and batteries.

While Palacio was being beaten, he had trouble breathing and believed he would die. The lot where he was left by the gendarmes turned out to be in Wilde, a district of Buenos Aires. On the morning of 31 December he found his way home. He was in shock and in pain throughout his body. His parents took him to a clinic, where he spent four hours receiving treatment. He was given painkillers and a splint was placed on his left arm.

His mother, Gabriela Flores, reported the attack at the office of the public prosecutor of Avellaneda that same day. On 3 January, Palacio submitted an additional report to the prosecutor's office. There were no witnesses to the beating, but some protesters observed his arrest.

The UTPBA condemned "this brutal attack" and called for a complete investigation. On 6 January 2014, Reporters Without Borders called on the Argentinian ministry of justice and human rights to investigate Palacio’s detention. "The many abuses by the security forces during 2013 cannot continue," Reporters Without Borders said. "The National Gendarmerie has repeatedly been criticized for its methods and must be held to account for this latest case of mistreatment. The justice ministry must signal its determination to end impunity." The LED (Freedom of Expression + Democracy) Foundation condemned the assault on Palacio.

On 27 March 2014, the Foro de Periodismo Argentino noted that the gendarmerie had not yet explained the attack on Palacio "and nobody seems to be demanding it."
