= Prilidiano Pueyrredón =

Argentine painter, architect and engineer

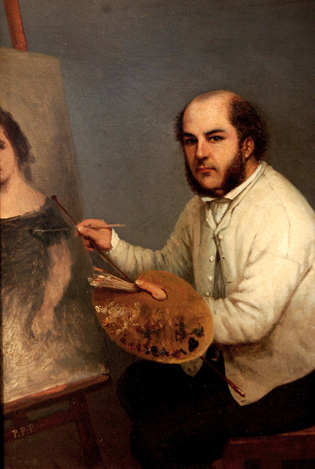
Self-portrait

Prilidiano Pueyrredón (January 24, 1823 – November 3, 1870) was an Argentine painter, architect and engineer. One of the country's first prominent painters, he was known for his costumbrist sensibility and preference for everyday themes.

== Early life ==
Pueyrredón was the only son of Juan Martín de Pueyrredón, then the Supreme Director of the United Provinces of the Río de la Plata, and María Calixta Tellechea y Caviedes, an aristocrat. He completed his primary education at the upper-class Colegio de la Independencia. In 1835 his family relocated to Europe, where he completed his education. He spent the school year in Paris and summers in Cádiz, where his father owned a business importing Argentine leather.

Six years later, as relations between France and Argentina suffered owing to the refusal of Juan Manuel de Rosas to grant commercial privileges to ships of French origin—a matter which would not be resolved until the Battle of Vuelta de Obligado a few years later—the Pueyrredóns left Europe for Rio de Janeiro. The city's liberal atmosphere encouraged Pueyrredón's artistic vocation. On his return to Paris three years later he received his parents' permission to study engineering.

== Return to Buenos Aires ==
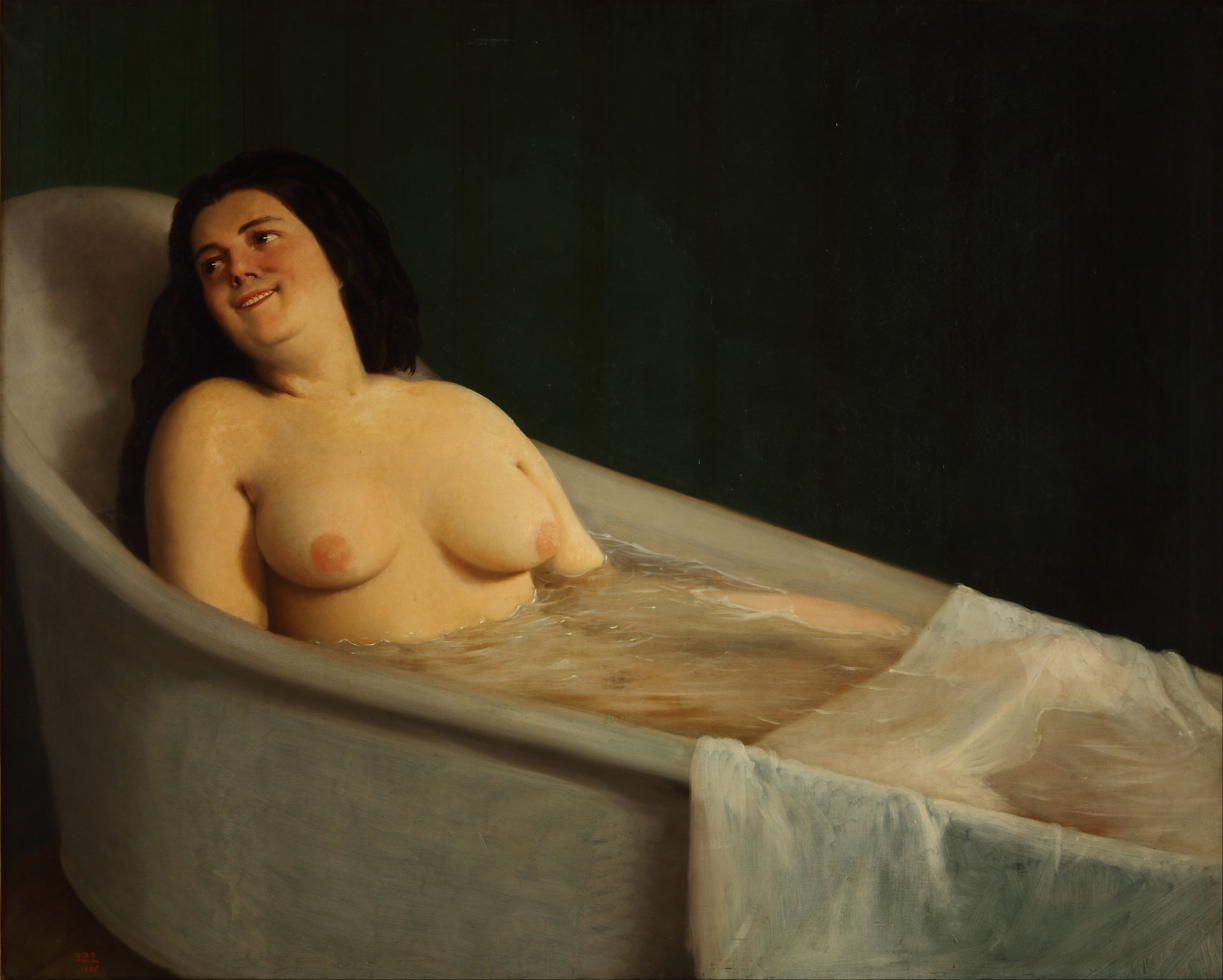
El baño (1865)

In 1849, because the elder Pueyrredón was seriously ill, the entire family returned to Buenos Aires. The general died the following year at the family estate in San Isidro. Although the young Prilidiano, already an engineer, was a peculiar figure by the standards of the porteño aristocracy, and although rumours abounded about his immorality, he managed to gain favour with the aristocracy by painting their portraits. His subjects included Manuelita, the daughter of Rosas, whom he painted in 1851, shortly before the caudillo's defeat at Caseros. He was the first painter in Buenos Aires to paint nudes, of which two, La siesta and El baño, survive to this day and are housed in the Museo Nacional de Bellas Artes.

In the middle of that year, however, he fell out with his cousin and neighbour Magdalena Costa, whom he had courted, and this drove him to leave the city and return temporarily to Cádiz. There, an affair with a local girl led to the birth of his only daughter.

== Artistic maturity ==
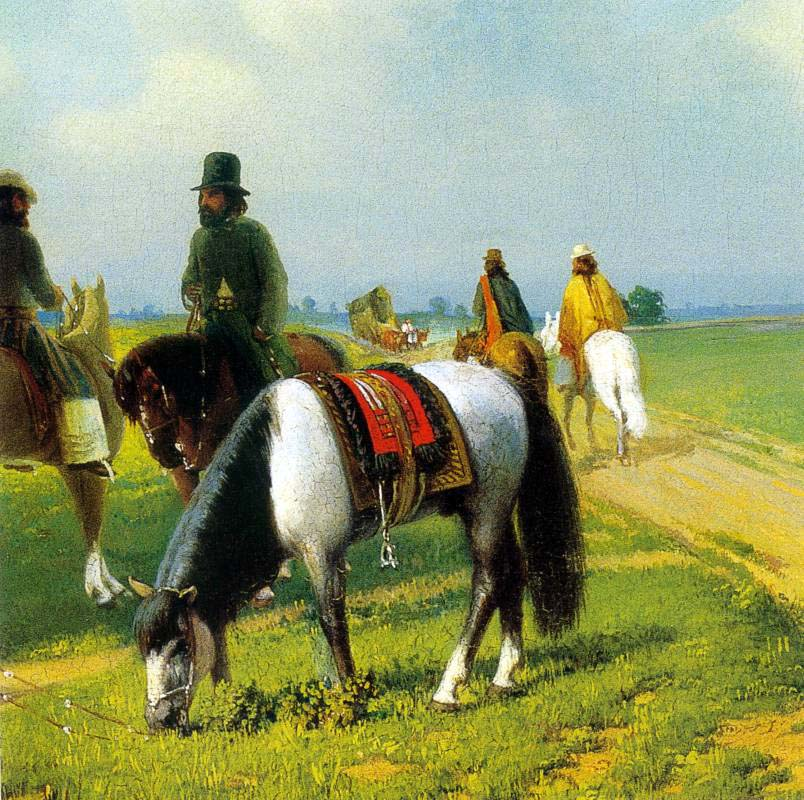
Detail of Un alto en el campo

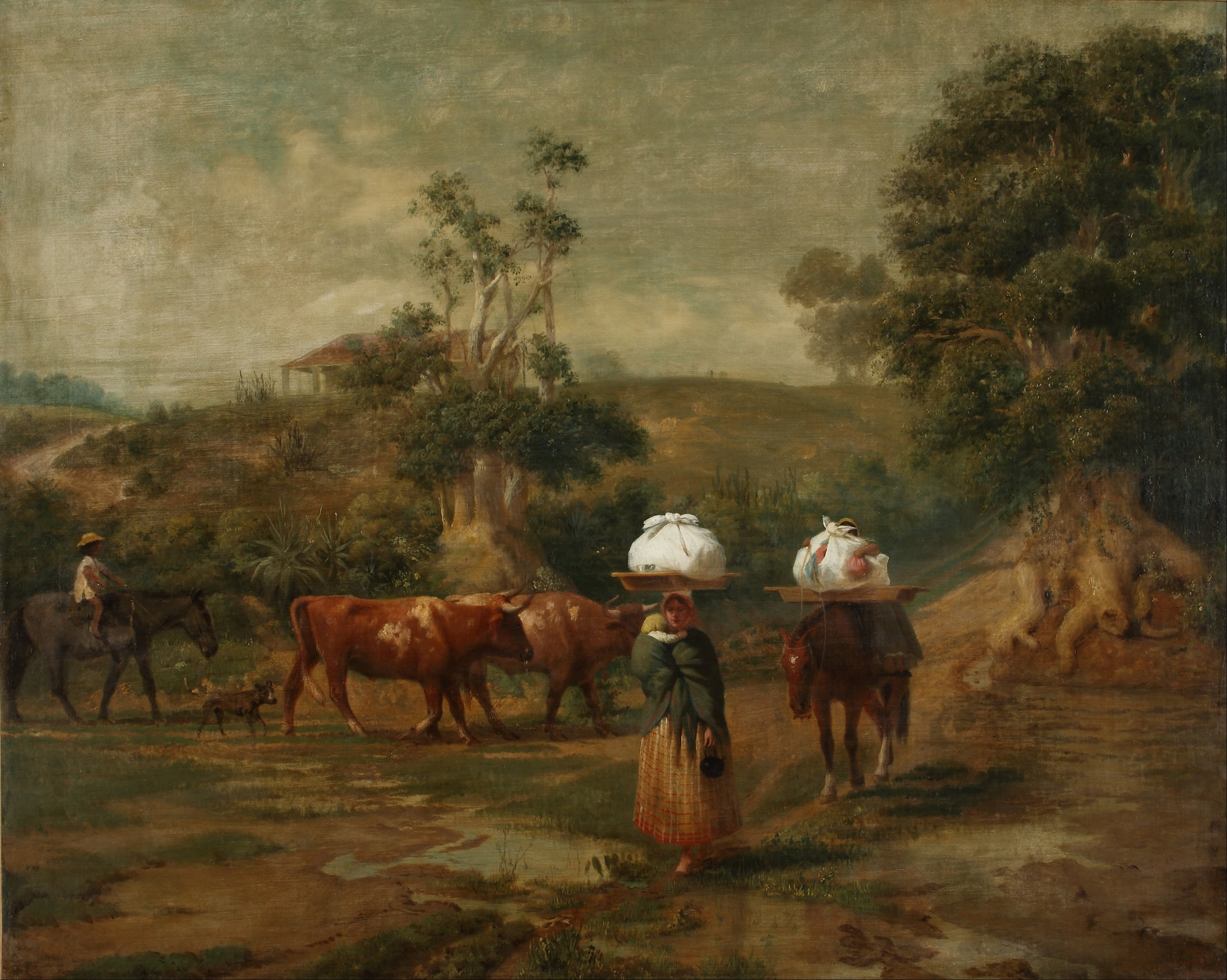
Lavanderas en el bajo de Belgrano

Pueyrredón returned to Buenos Aires for the last time in 1854, and applied his engineering and architectural skills to the extensive public works upon which the city's port, separated from the Argentine Confederation, had embarked. He worked on the restoration and enlargement of various monuments, among them the chapel of Recoleta, the Pyramid of the Plaza de Mayo, and the Casa Rosada. As an urban planner, he designed the Plaza de la Victoria, a park on what was then the Julio Avenue, and the bridge in the neighborhood of Barracas. He also designed the mansion built by Miguel de Azcuénaga in Olivos which later became the official residence of the President of Argentina.

The 1850s and 1860s were Pueyrredón's most prolific period as a painter. 233 works survive from this period, more than half of them commissioned portraits. During this period he became one of the first painters to explore the figure of the gaucho, whom he depicted in the Romantic style he had discovered while living in Europe. Many of his most famous works depict life in the wilds of the Pampas and on the banks of the Río de la Plata: Un alto en el campo (1861), Capataz y peón de campo (1864), Lavanderas del Bajo Belgrano (1865), and Recorriendo la estancia (1865).

Pueyrredón died on November 3, 1870, aged 47, at his family's estate in San Isidro. He was largely forgotten until the 1930s, when Argentine critics recognized his contributions to the country's artistic heritage. Particularly admired is his portrait of his father.

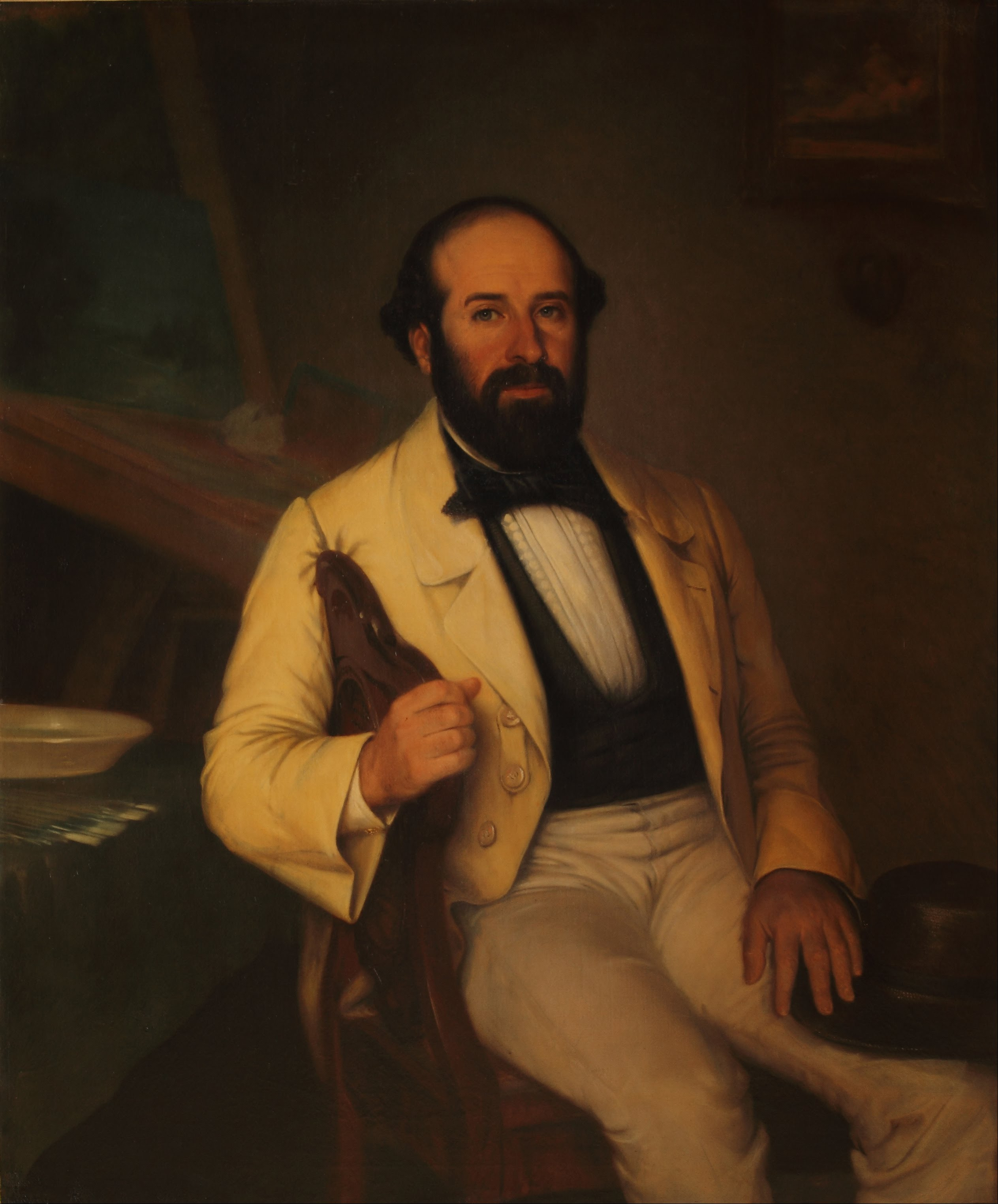
Santiago Calzadilla

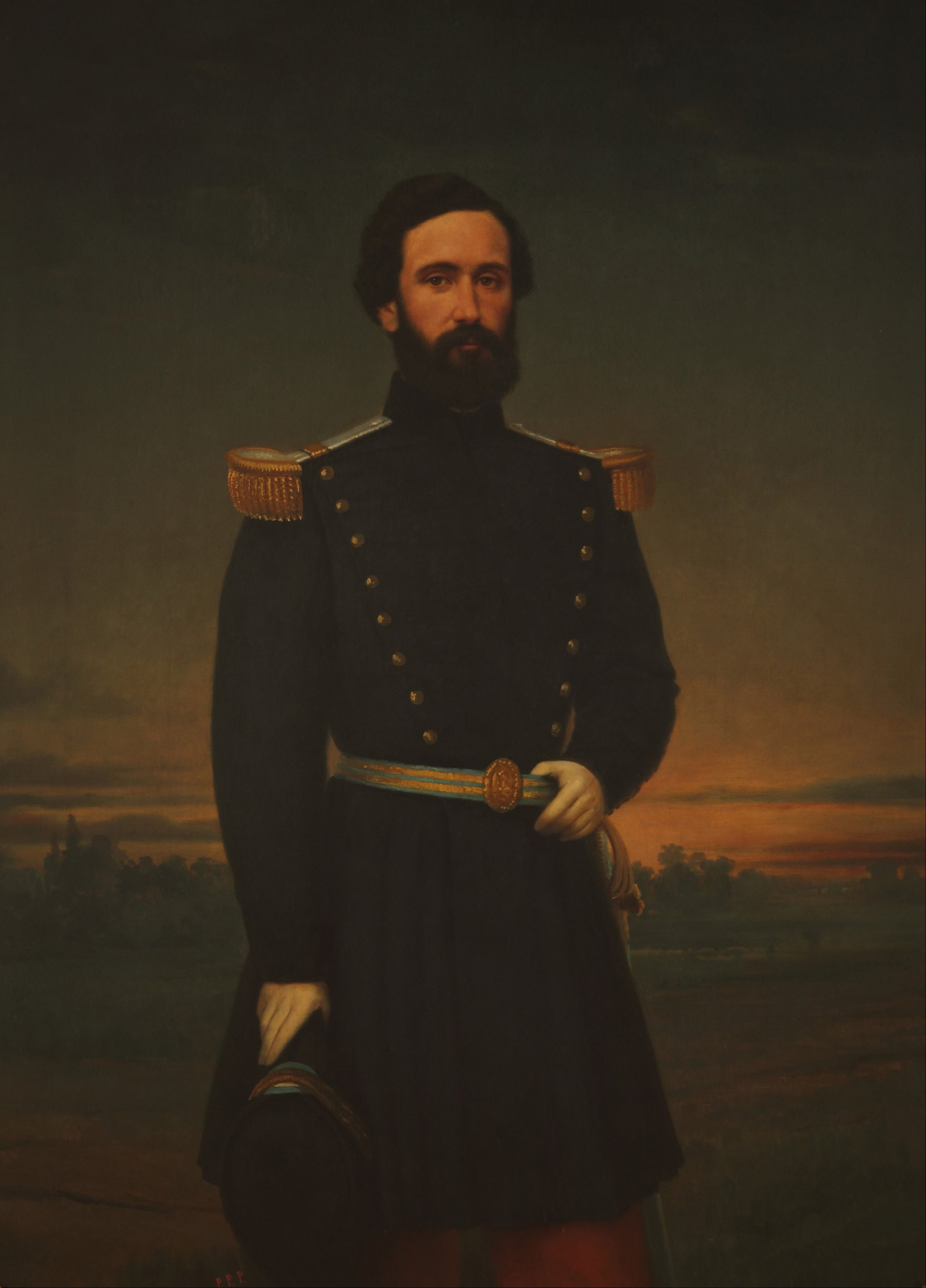
Don Alejandro Díaz

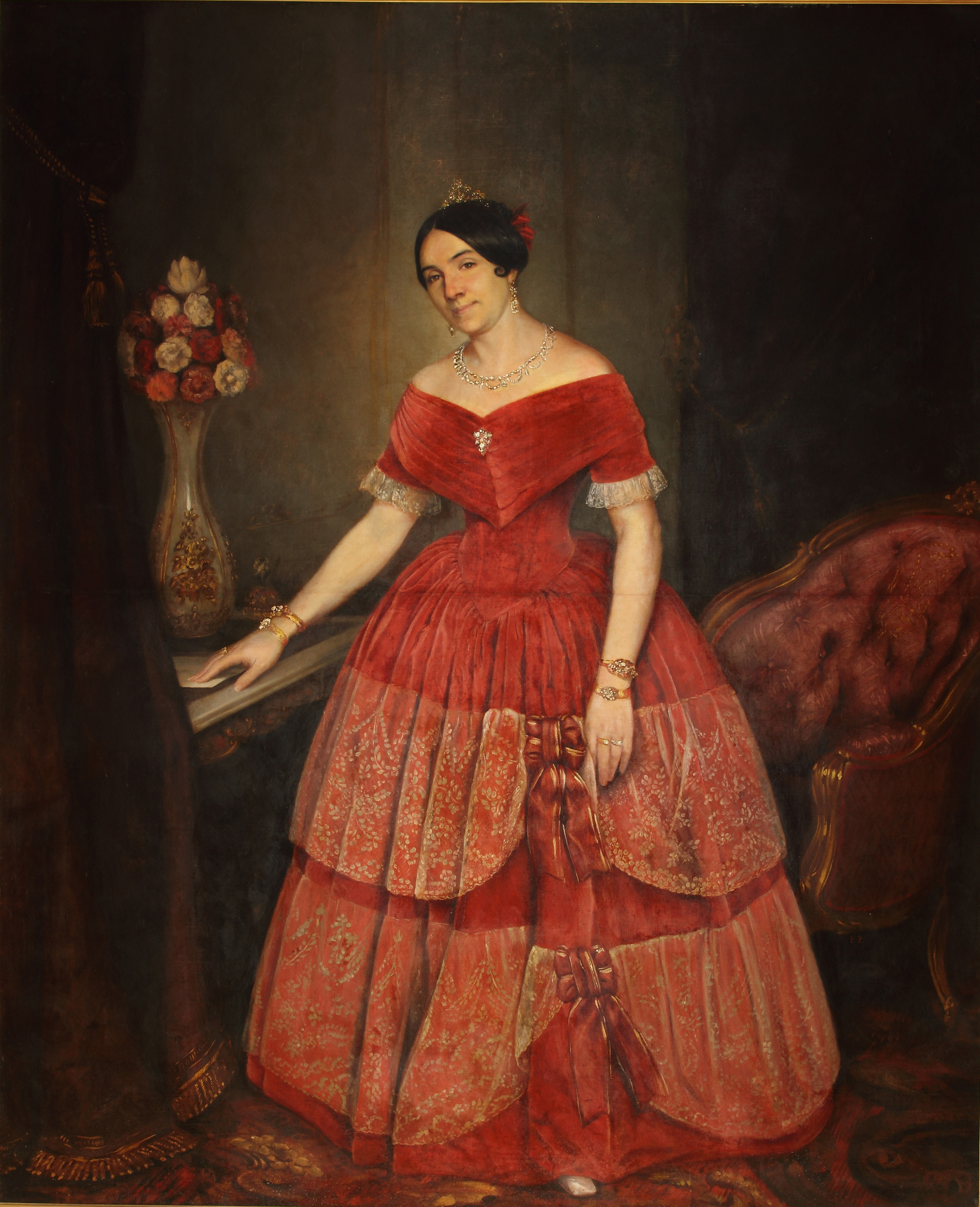
e Manuela Rosas de Terrero (1817-1898)

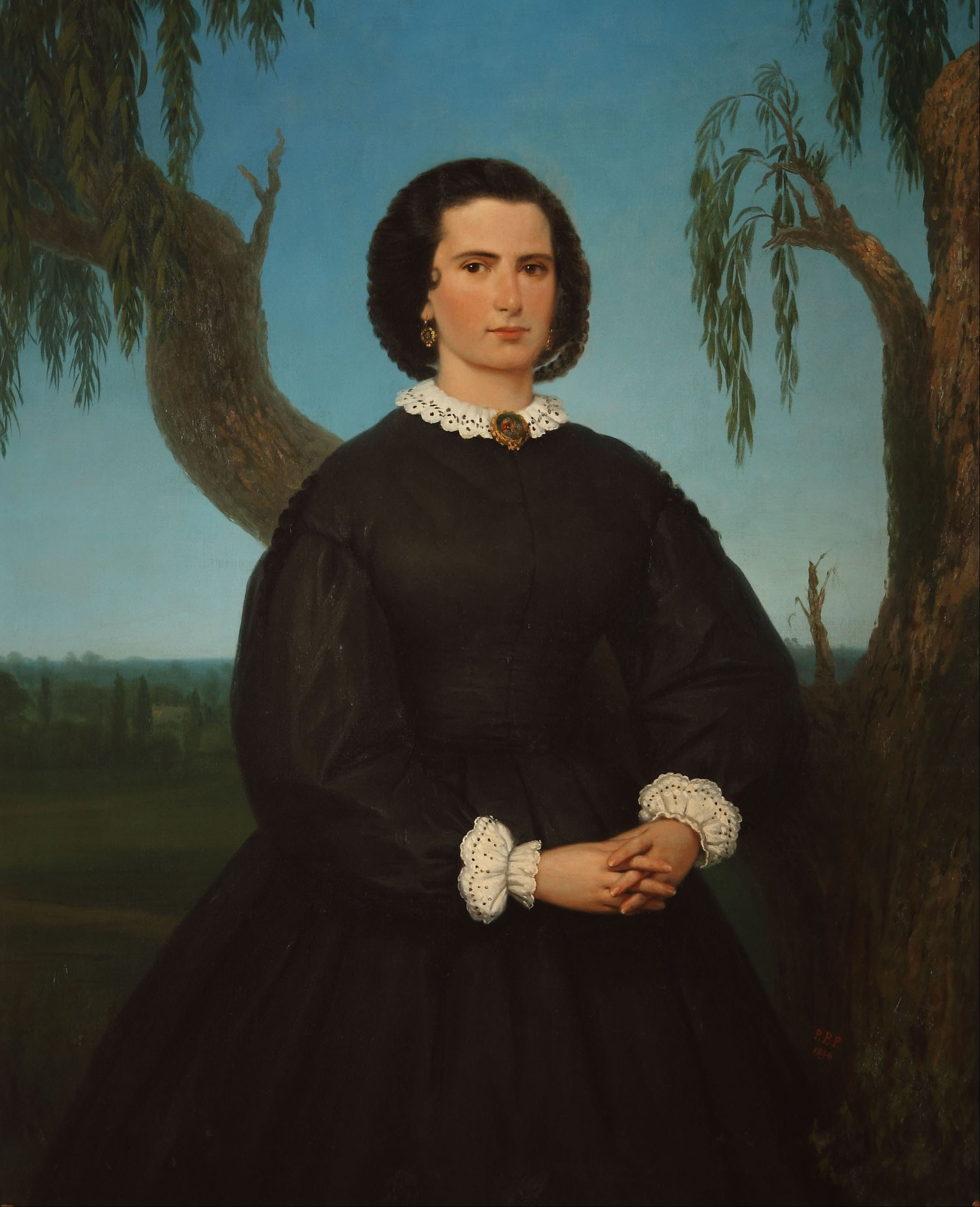
Doña Josefa Sáenz Valiente
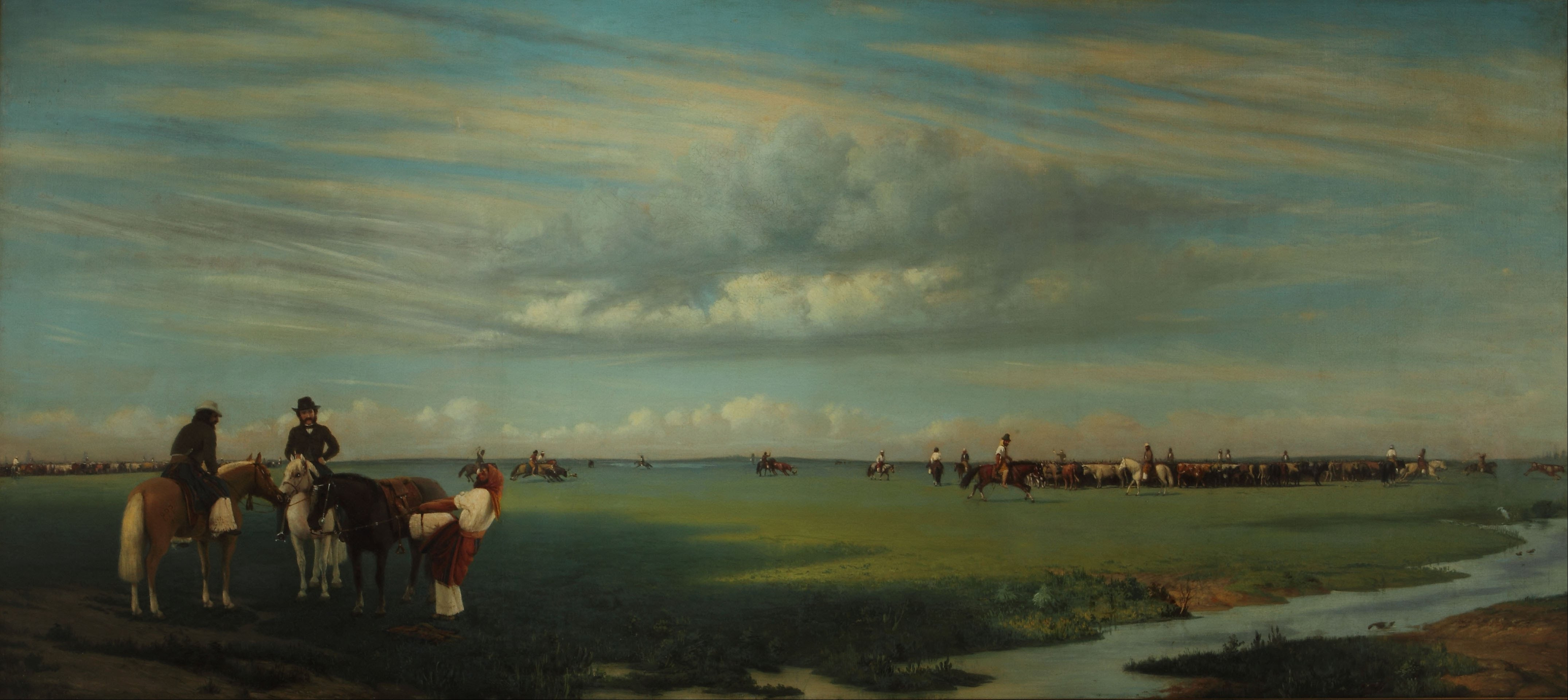
El rodeo

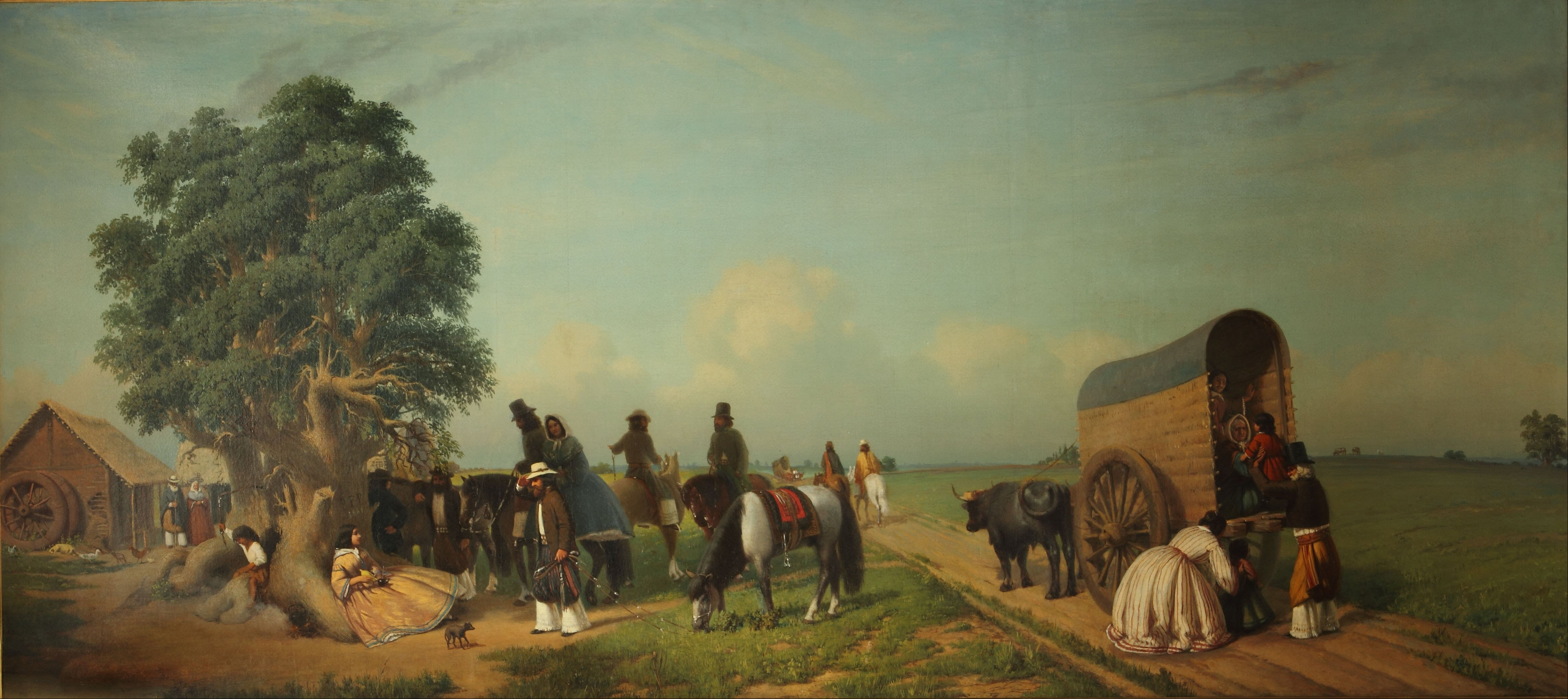
Un alto en el campo

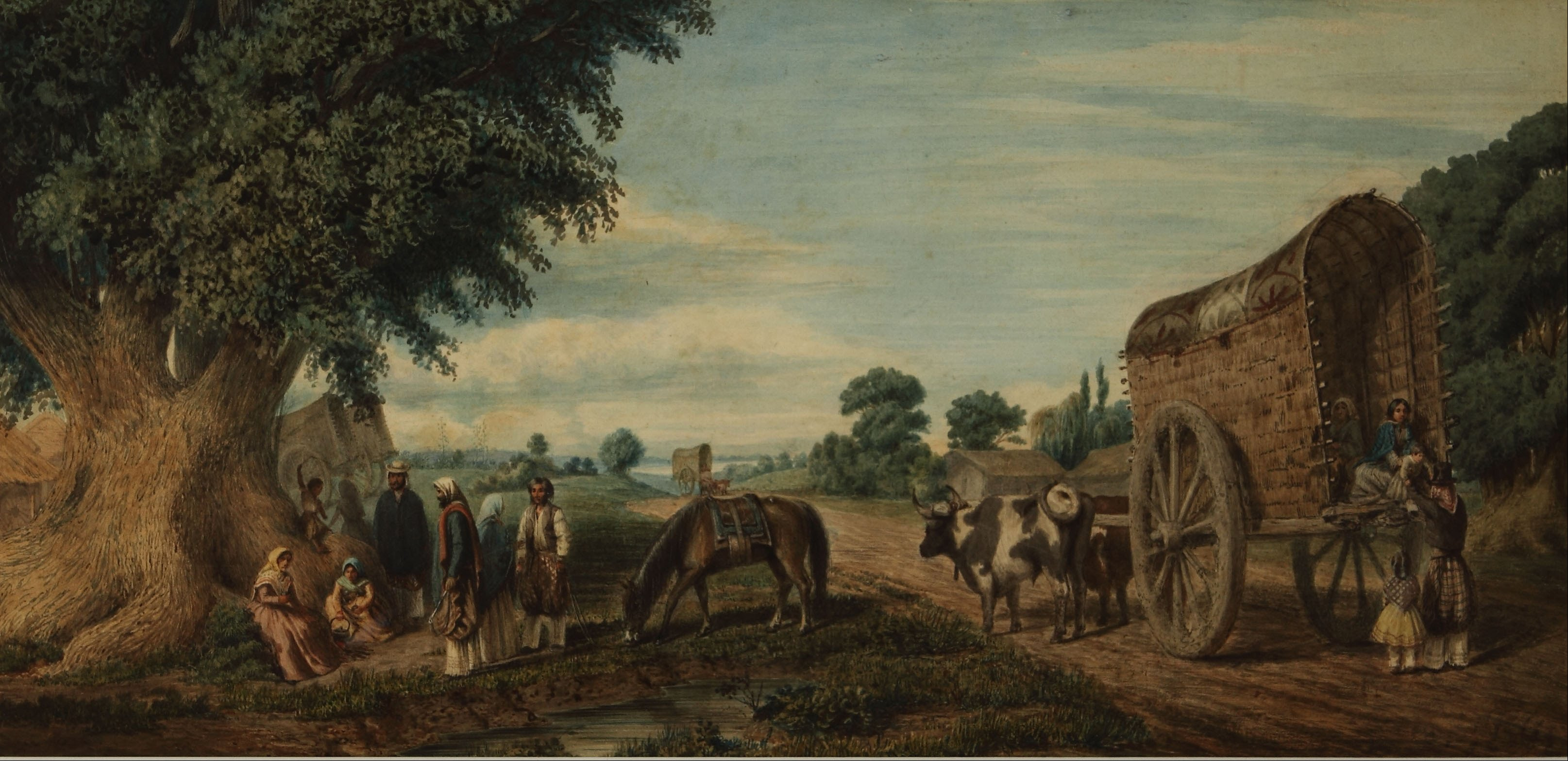
Un domingo en los suburbios de San Isidro
