= Avellaneda Partido =

Avellaneda Partido de Avellaneda
- Department
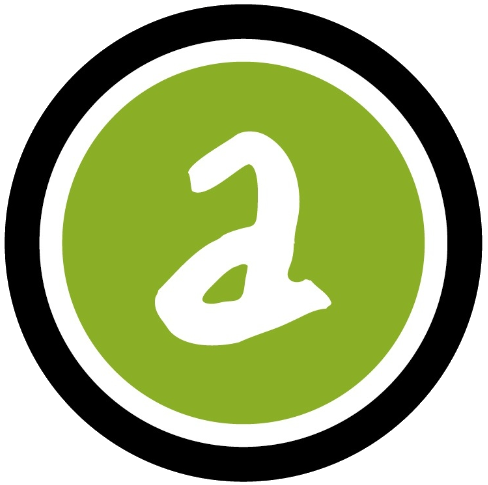
- Logo

- Location of Avellaneda in Gran Buenos Aires
- Coordinates: 34°40′S 58°21′W
- Country: Argentina
- Province: Buenos Aires
- Established: April 7, 1852
- Founder: provincial law
- Seat: Avellaneda

Government
  - Intendant: Magdalena Sierra (PJ-UP)

Area
  - Total: 55.17 km^{2} (21.30 sq mi)

Population
  - Total: 340,985
  - Density: 6,181/km^{2} (16,010/sq mi)
- Demonym: avellanedense
- Postal Code: B1870
- IFAM: BUE005
- Area Code: 011
- Website: mda.gob.ar/avellaneda/

Avellaneda is a partido in Buenos Aires Province, Argentina. It has an area of 55.17 km^{2} (21.3 sq mi) and a population of 663,953 in 2001. Its administrative seat is the city of Avellaneda.

The partido is located in the Greater Buenos Aires urban area, separated from the city of Buenos Aires by the Matanza River, popularly known as Riachuelo. The Bartolomé Mitre is the main avenue of the district, connecting with the main federal city through two bridges, the Pueyrredón Bridge to Barracas and the New Pueyrredón Bridge, directly to the 9 de Julio Avenue. The Nicolás Avellaneda Bridge also connects the Isla Maciel (in Dock Sud) with La Boca neighbourhood.

== Name ==
The Partido was known as Barracas al Sud (Southern Barracks), until it was renamed in honor of Nicolás Avellaneda in 1904.

== Settlements ==
The Avellaneda Partido is subdivided into four cities and four localities (localidades), listed here with their populations (as of 2001):

Avellaneda	328,980
Crucecita	22,000
Dock Sud	35,897
Gerli	64,640
Piñeiro	26,979
Sarandí	60,752
Villa Domínico	58,824
Wilde	65,881

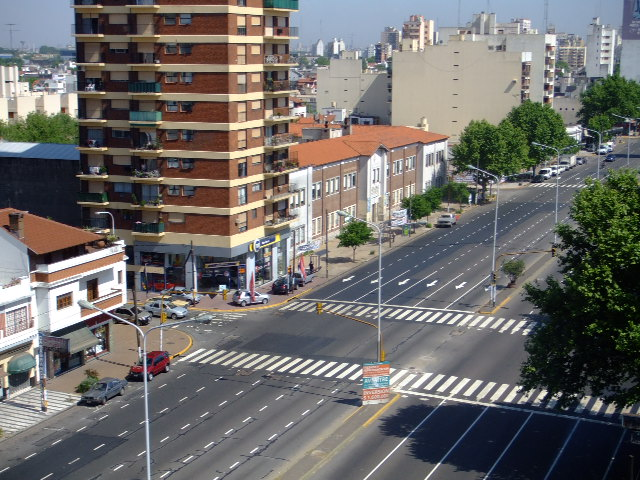
Mitre Avenue

Between Dock Sud, Sarandí, Villa Domínico and Wilde there is an area called Reserva Cinturón Ecológico, ("Environmental Belt Rerserve Area") which is a part of a network of waste dumps, which after reaching capacity are planted with greenery.

== Sport ==
Avellaneda is home to two of the most famous football clubs in Argentina: Independiente and Racing.

The partido is also home to several other football teams including Arsenal de Sarandí of the Primera Division Argentina, and lower league teams San Telmo, Dock Sud and Victoriano Arenas.
