= Piquetero =

Member of a group that blocks a street with the purpose of demonstrating

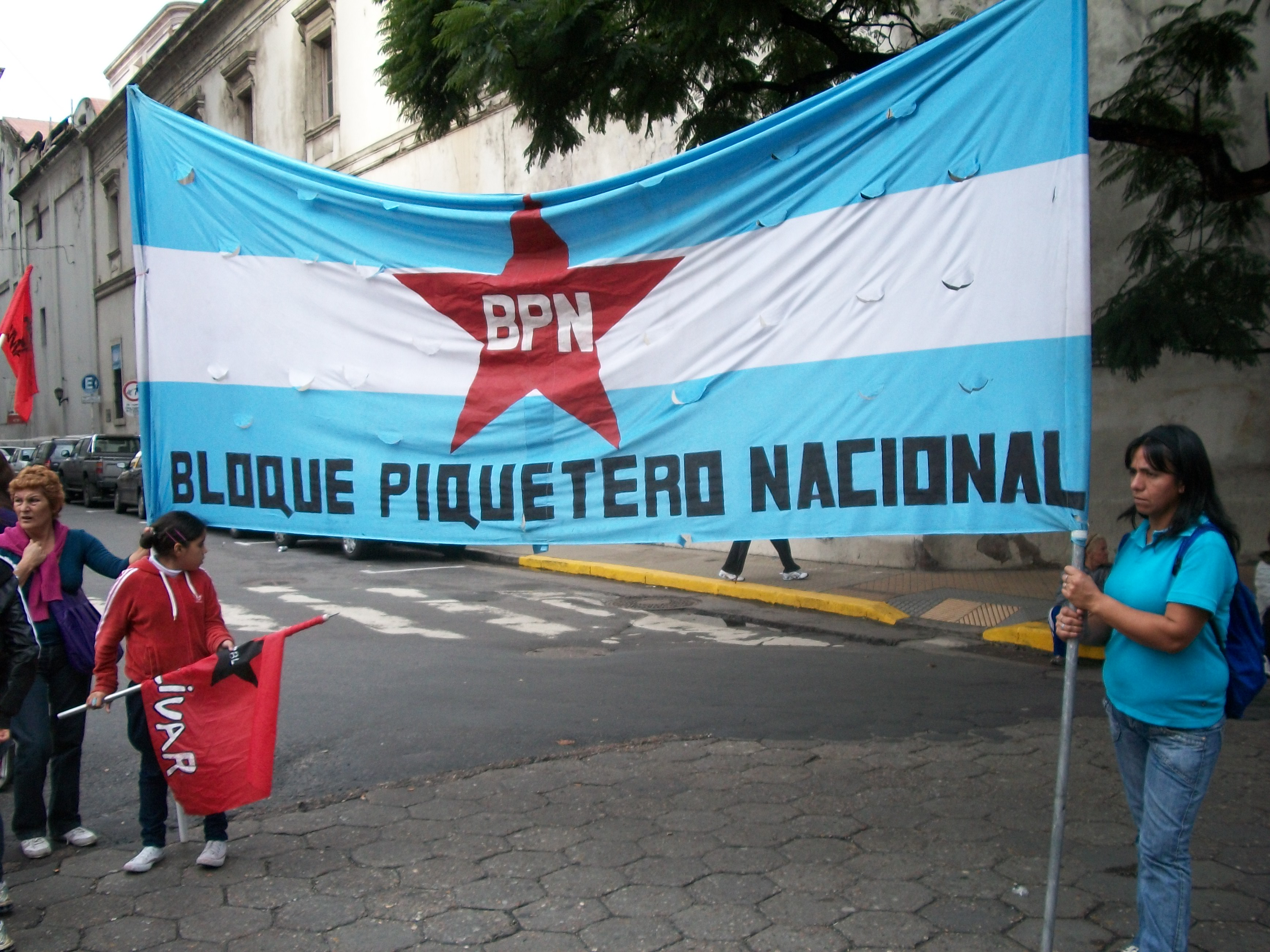
- Piqueteros hold a banner of the Bloque Piquetero Nacional during the Argentine Bicentennial
- Date: 1990s–present
- Location: Argentina
- Caused by: Economic turmoil resulting from imposition of shock therapy
- Methods: Form of picketing

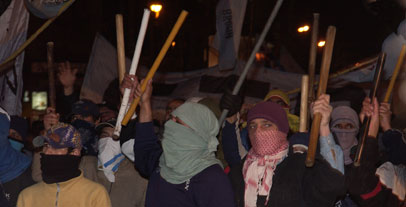
Piqueteros at a protest rally, September 2005

A piquetero is a member of a group that has blocked a street with the purpose of demonstrating and calling attention over a particular issue or demand. The word is a neologism in Argentine Spanish, coming from piquete (in English, "picket"), that is, its specific meaning as a standing or walking demonstration of protest in a significant spot. The practice began in Argentina in the mid-1990s during the administration of President Carlos Menem, soon becoming a frequent form of protest that still prevails on the South American socio-political scene. In 2005, it was reported that 70% of the piqueteros are women, and some of their leaders are women too, like Milagro Sala from Jujuy.

Piquetero organizations have also been fiercely criticized at times by many in Argentina, accusing them of being associated with organized crime and alleging unconstitutionality, in accordance with Article 14 of the Argentine Constitution, which states that citizens must be guaranteed the right to "enter, remain in, travel in and out of Argentine territory" and in turn according to art. 194 of the Penal Code provides: "Whoever, without creating a situation endangering the community, prevent, hinder or delay the normal operation of transport by land, water or air or utilities communications, water supply, electricity or energy substances shall be punished with imprisonment three months to two years"

== Origins ==
The piqueteros appeared first in June 1996 in the Patagonian town of Cutral Có, province of Neuquén, when workers laid off by then state-owned oil company YPF blocked National Route 22. Like many other small towns throughout Argentina, Cutral-Có depended almost exclusively on the jobs provided by a single local company.

== Piqueteros as a national phenomenon ==
During the latter half of the 1990s, as the Argentine economy lost competitiveness and exports markets due to the over-valued fixed exchange rate, and many former state companies were sold to private corporations, many Argentines lost their jobs. The piquetero form of protest soon spread to the impoverished neighbourhoods and de-industrialized towns of Greater Buenos Aires, starting in Florencio Varela and La Matanza, as well as other provinces. In 1997 there were 23 roadblocks in Buenos Aires Province, and a total of 77 in the whole country.

Eventually, piqueteros began assembling in a more organized fashion, forming "Unemployed Workers Movements" (Movimientos de Trabajadores Desempleados, abbreviated as MTDs). Protests expanded from major road-blocking pickets, to blockades of important streets in, or just outside, cities, as well as bridges and accesses to economically critical spots (for example, directly in front of major stores and supermarkets). In some instances, government buildings were blocked and occupied by force. The MTDs also began involving themselves in co-operatives for a myriad of purposes, such as barter markets for goods and services, small-scale food production, sewing workshops, food-ration distributing facilities, etc. A number of piqueteros now participate, support, or otherwise have ties with the recovered factory movement (for example in the former ceramic tile factory Zanon, now FaSinPat).

== Piqueteros during the crisis ==
Protesters deface a facility of SIDE.

In 2002, two piqueteros, Darío Santillán and Maximiliano Kosteki, were killed during protests at the Avellaneda train station, few blocks from the New Pueyrredón Bridge of Buenos Aires. Judicial investigations and the Argentine press blame the Secretariat of Intelligence (SIDE) for participation in the organization of these events. On the second anniversary of the killings, a defacement of one of SIDE's bases was done in protest. Involvement of SIDE has not been proven so far. In early 2006, Alfredo Fanchiotti and Alejandro Acosta, two policemen who participated in the repression, were convicted of murder. Relatives and comrades of the piqueteros killed that day, claim that the prosecutor and the judge intentionally avoided looking for the politician that ordered and directed the repression.

== Political involvement in the MTDs ==
The success of the MTDs soon attracted the attention of political actors, from two main fronts: old, traditionally fragmented leftist parties and movements, and the Peronist Party. During the late 1990s, piqueteros in Greater Buenos Aires came to overlap with the manzaneras, agents of the anti-Menem Peronist machine of provincial governor Eduardo Duhalde. By 2005, many large MTDs in Buenos Aires were co-opted, either by radical, intransigent left-wing ideological factions, or by the local Peronist municipal administrations, linked to former Buenos Aires governor and then interim president Eduardo Duhalde, and others to supporters of former president Néstor Kirchner.

The Peronist Party connection is particularly important given that piquetero groups have acquired a hierarchical structure, where benefits are shared from the top down, and in many cases the heads of the movements serve as intermediaries for the distribution of government welfare subsidies, from which each member of the piquetero organization must discount a small sum to support the logistics of the protests, the hiring and maintenance of assembly facilities, etc. Welfare subsidies come for example under the forms of Planes Trabajar, which consist in 20 hours per week "contracts" used by public institutions and paid 150 pesos (less than US$50) a month.

== Criticism and fragmentation ==
Criticism towards piqueteros and MTDs comes from three sides: middle-class Argentinians, right-wing political actors, and piqueteros themselves. Among the decimated, but still numerous, Argentine middle class, the common criticism is that piqueteros, while morally and legally entitled to protest and demonstrate, should not do so by blocking important roads and streets, since this violates other people's right to circulate freely and often results in delays (from the relatively trivial problem of arriving home later after work, to the very serious of ambulances with critical patients being stopped by a picket). The so-called "violent" attitude of some piqueteros, who cover their faces with scarfs or handkerchiefs, as a claimed form of protection against police retaliation, and who wield sticks, can be interpreted as a visible threat towards passers-by and police; this is usually pointed out as proof. On occasion, critics can become violent as well, when faced with a picket. So, people who criticize the piqueteros may agree with the need to provide relief for the poor and unemployed, but disagree on the form of the demands.

The political right, speaking mainly through politicians and journalists, but resonating with many other Argentinians, overtly or covertly equates piqueteros with criminals. Violent incidents with piqueteros have ended up with people wounded, cars and houses damaged, etc. Even non-violent blockades are formally illegal, if they cause serious disruption. Occupation of state and private buildings, including supermarkets and casinos, followed by demands of money and food supplies, has also occurred in the recent past. People advocating the application of the law against blockades request that the government outlaw the protests and suppress them, using violent means if necessary; however, most pickets end without violence. Former President Mauricio Macri has even disparagingly called piqueteros as "orcs". Piqueteros themselves have become fragmented. The movements supported by leftist parties, as well as the independent ones, criticize piquetero leaders, who have chosen to support the national Kirchner administration (which is viewed by them as a relatively progressive government). In turn, the left-wing piqueteros are portrayed by the others as representatives of an unproductive, non-constructive radical opposition, sometimes encouraging violent action.
