= Área Reserva Cinturón Ecológico =

- Location in Greater Buenos Aires
- Coordinates: 34°41′S 58°17′W
- Country: Argentina
- Province: Buenos Aires
- Partido: Avellaneda
- Elevation: 7 m (23 ft)

Population (2001 census [INDEC])
  - Total: 3,408
- CPA Base: B 1870
- Area code: +54 11

The Cinturón Ecological Reserve (Área Reserva Cinturón Ecológico) is an area of the Avellaneda Partido, Buenos Aires Province, Argentina. It is located on the bank of the Río de la Plata.

The Area Reserva Cinturón Ecológico, the "Environmental Belt Reserve Area," was planned during the last dictatorship as an ecological approach to caring for the incinerator-generated landfill matter from Buenos Aires thousands of apartment buildings. Buenos Aires' Mayor Osvaldo Cacciatore's 1978 initiative called for curbside pickup service of the 5,400 daily tons of refuse previously incinerated but now sent to landfills circling the city that when filled would be transformed into greenbelt parklands to be created atop. With a population of 3,408 #2001 census [INDEC]# it is the least populated area in Avellaneda Partido.
