= New Pueyrredón Bridge =

New Pueyrredón Bridge Nuevo Puente Pueyrredón
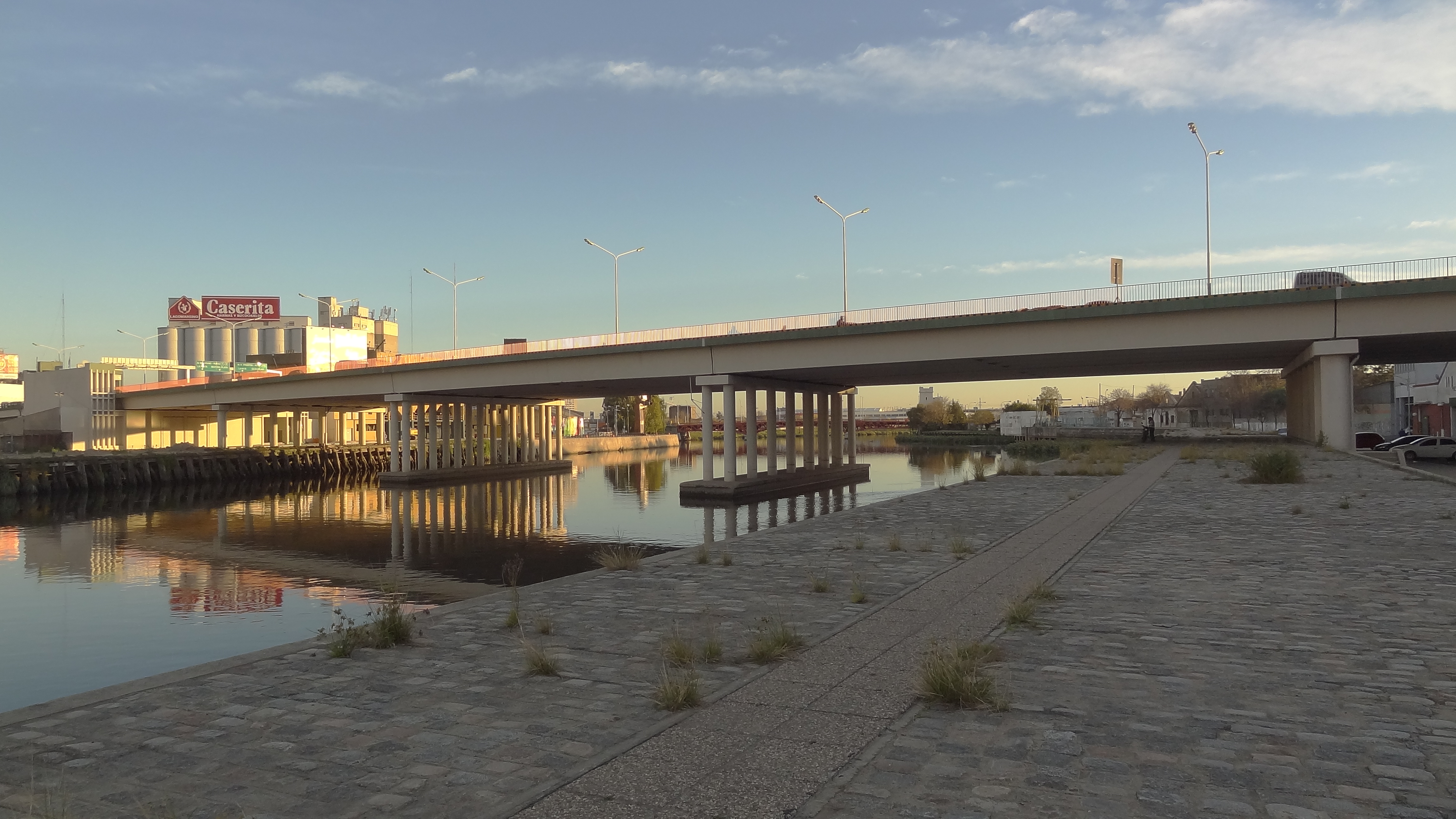
- View from the east
- Coordinates: 34°39′18″S 58°22′16″W
- Carries: Motor vehicles, pedestrians and bicycles
- Crosses: Matanza River
- Locale: Buenos Aires Province
- Official name: Nuevo Puente Prilidiano Pueyrredón
- Maintained by: Dirección Nacional de Vialidad

Characteristics
- Design: Lauro Laura
- Material: Reinforced concrete
- Total length: 1,200.00 metres (3,937.01 ft)
- Width: 37.20 metres (122.0 ft)
- Height: 10.00 metres (32.81 ft)

History
- Construction start: 1965
- Construction end: 1969
- Construction cost: US$ 500,000
- Inaugurated: December 19, 1969; 56 years ago

Location
- Interactive map of New Pueyrredón Bridge

The New Pueyrredón Bridge, officially New Prilidiano Pueyrredón Bridge, is a bridge in Buenos Aires, Argentina, that connects President Arturo Frondizi Highway (AU9, formerly 9 de Julio Sur Highway) in Barracas neighborhood with Bartolomé Mitre and Hipólito Yrigoyen avenues, both in Avellaneda Partido. The bridge crosses over Matanza River (popularly known as Riachuelo), carrying vehicular and pedestrian traffic between both points.

The structure is made of reinforced concrete.

== History ==
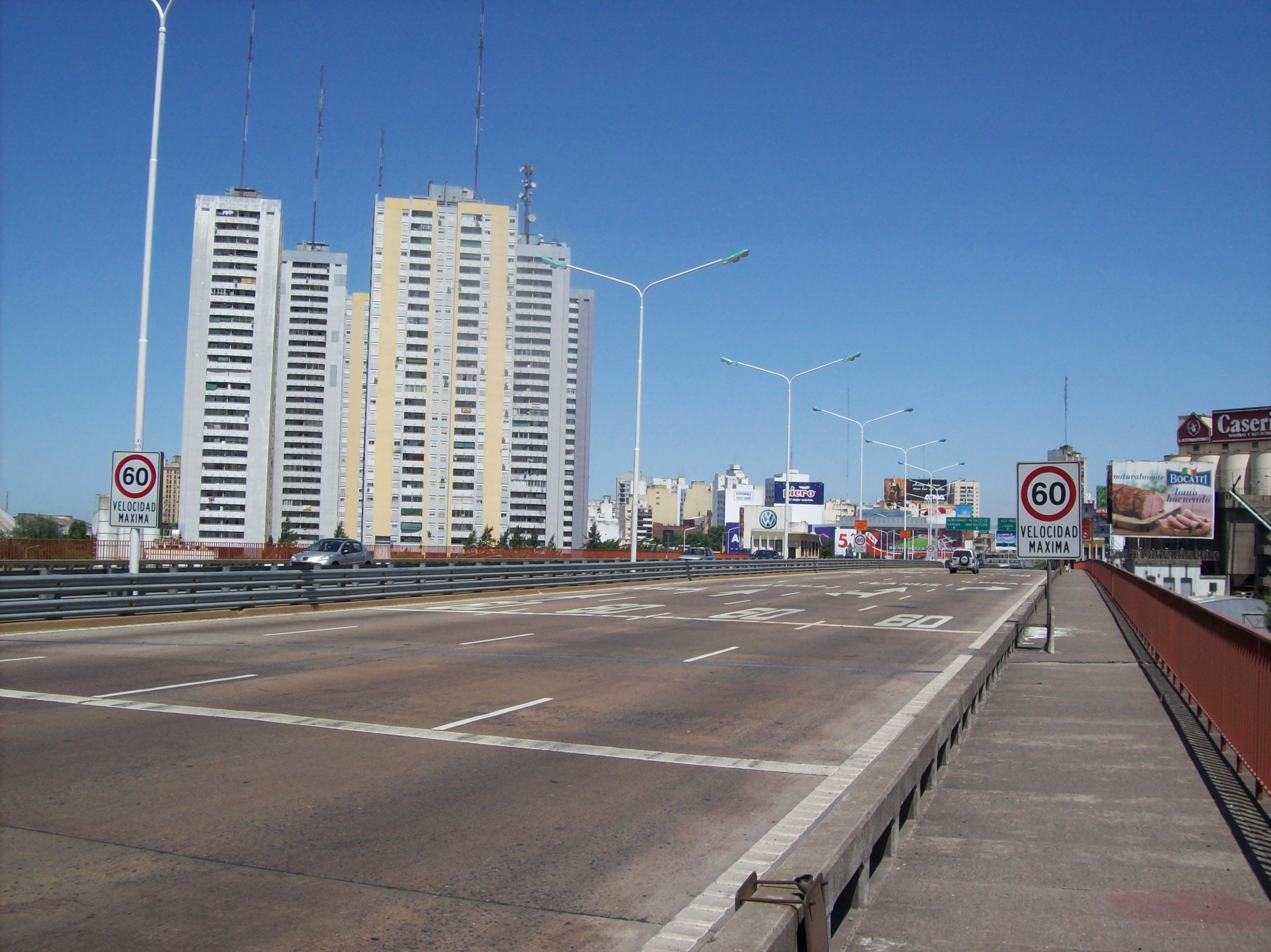
Bridge's pavement and pedestrian area, 2008.

The new bridge was built to replace Pueyrredón Bridge because of the increasing vehicular traffic on it, adding a point to connect Buenos Aires and Avellaneda districts with the purpose of mitigate the traffic congestions on Hipólito Yrigoyen (then named Pavón) and Bartolomé Mitre avenues of Avellaneda.

By 1965 the Pueyrredón Bridge carried about 90,000 vehicles per day, causing frequent traffic congestions. Engineer Lauro Laura (from "Dirección Nacional de Vialidad", the Argentine national office in charge of the development, planning and conservation of national routes), took over the project to create a new bridge.

The National Government expropriated the 99 houses on the path before demolishing them to build a bridge. Meanwhile, company "Empresa Argentina de Cemento Armado" (EACA) was awarded the tender for the construction. Originally, the access to the bridge was on Montes de Oca Avenue in Barracas. When the 9 de Julio Sur Highway was opened in the 1980s, it became the main access.

The New Puente Pueyrredón was inaugurated on December 19, 1969.

During the 2000s, groups of piqueteros blocked the bridge repeatedly as a way of calling attention over their demands. In December 2002, one of those blocks ended in the dead of two activists, Maximiliano Kosteki and Manuel Santillán, killed by Provincial policemen in the Avellaneda railway station, distant few blocks from the bridge.

== See also ==
- Pueyrredón Bridge
