= Santa Ana, Entre Ríos =

Coordinates: 30°54′S 57°56′W

Santa Ana (Entre Ríos)
- Municipality and village
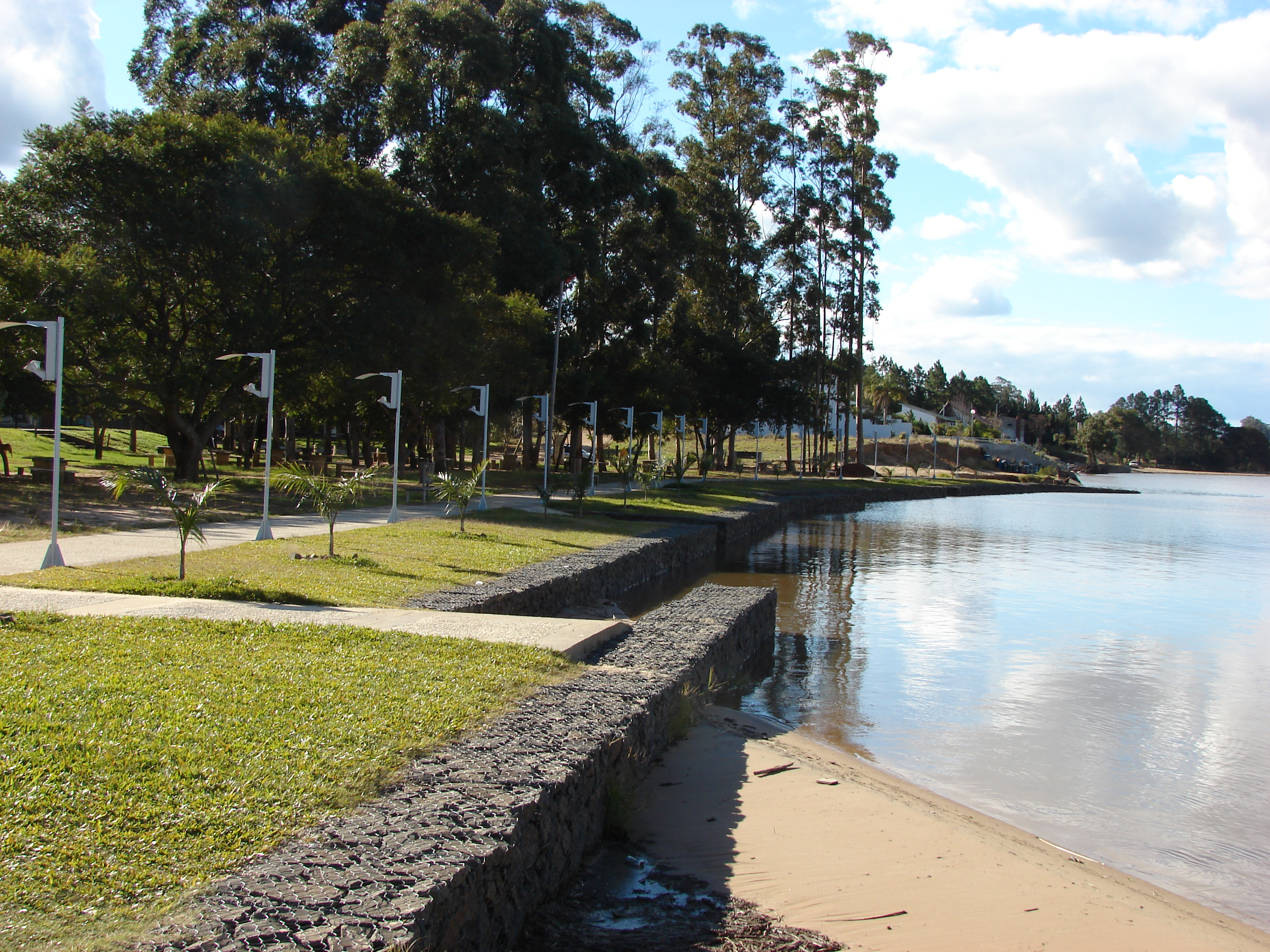
- Interactive map of Santa Ana (Entre Ríos)
- Country: Argentina
- Province: Entre Ríos Province
- Time zone: UTC−3 (ART)

Santa Ana (Entre Ríos) is a village and municipality in Entre Ríos Province in north-eastern Argentina.

The 1979 completion of the Salto Grande Dam put thousands of acres under water, and Santa Ana shifted to citrus production, which now supports 60% of the population.
