= Dock Sud =

Town in Buenos Aires Province, Argentina

- Town
- Location near Buenos Aires City Location in the Greater Buenos Aires#Location in Argentina Dock Sud (Argentina)
- Coordinates: 34°38′30″S 58°20′52″W
- Country: Argentina
- Province: Buenos Aires
- Partido: Avellaneda
- Elevation: 11 m (36 ft)

Population (2001 census [INDEC])
  - Total: 35,897
- CPA Base: B 1871
- Area code: +54 11

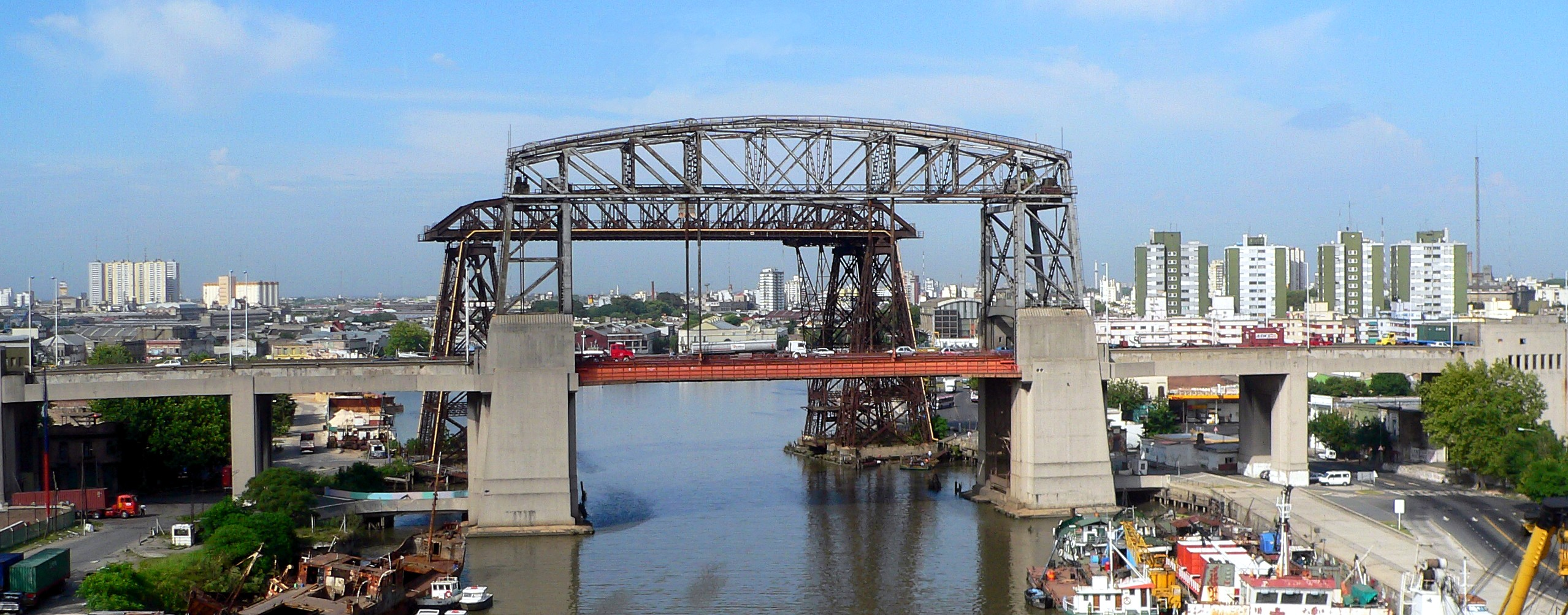
The Nicolás Avellaneda Bridge, connecting Dock Sud (left) to Buenos Aires

Dock Sud is a town of Avellaneda Partido in Buenos Aires Province, Argentina. It forms part of the urban agglomeration of Greater Buenos Aires.

The area is characterized by its predominantly working-class background, with many of its inhabitants pertaining to diverse immigrant communities. Dock Sud is home to the bulk of Argentina's Cape Verdean community.

== Sport ==
The area is home to Club Sportivo Dock Sud a football team playing in the lower leagues of Argentine football. Former Argentina national football team captain Javier Zanetti grew up in Dock Sud.

== Neighbourhoods ==
The oldest and most important neighborhood in Dock Sud is Isla Maciel, which is home to Club Atlético San Telmo. The Nicolás Avellaneda housing complex, started in 1973 by President Héctor Cámpora, is the second most important, and is located on the eastern side of the Buenos Aires-La Plata Freeway. Dock Sud, a predominantly working-class district, has in recent decades been afflicted with some of the nation's highest crime rates.
