= Santa Ana, Santa Fe =

Santa Ana
- Paraje
- Interactive map of Santa Ana
- Location within Santa Fe Province Location within Argentina
- Coordinates: 28.9829486989304°S 59.6453963372735°W
- Country: Argentina
- Province: Santa Fe
- Department: General Obligado
- Municipality: Municipality of Avellaneda

Population (2024)
  - Total: 265

Santa Ana is a paraje located in the Province of Santa Fe, Argentina, in the General Obligado Department, pertaining to the Municipality of Avellaneda. Is located 15 km at north of the city of Avellaneda and to 340 km to the north of the Capital City of Santa Fe. It limits the North with Flor de Oro, the South with Moussy, the East with El Timbó and the West with La Colmena.
