= Pueyrredón Bridge =

Pueyrredón Bridge Puente Pueyrredón
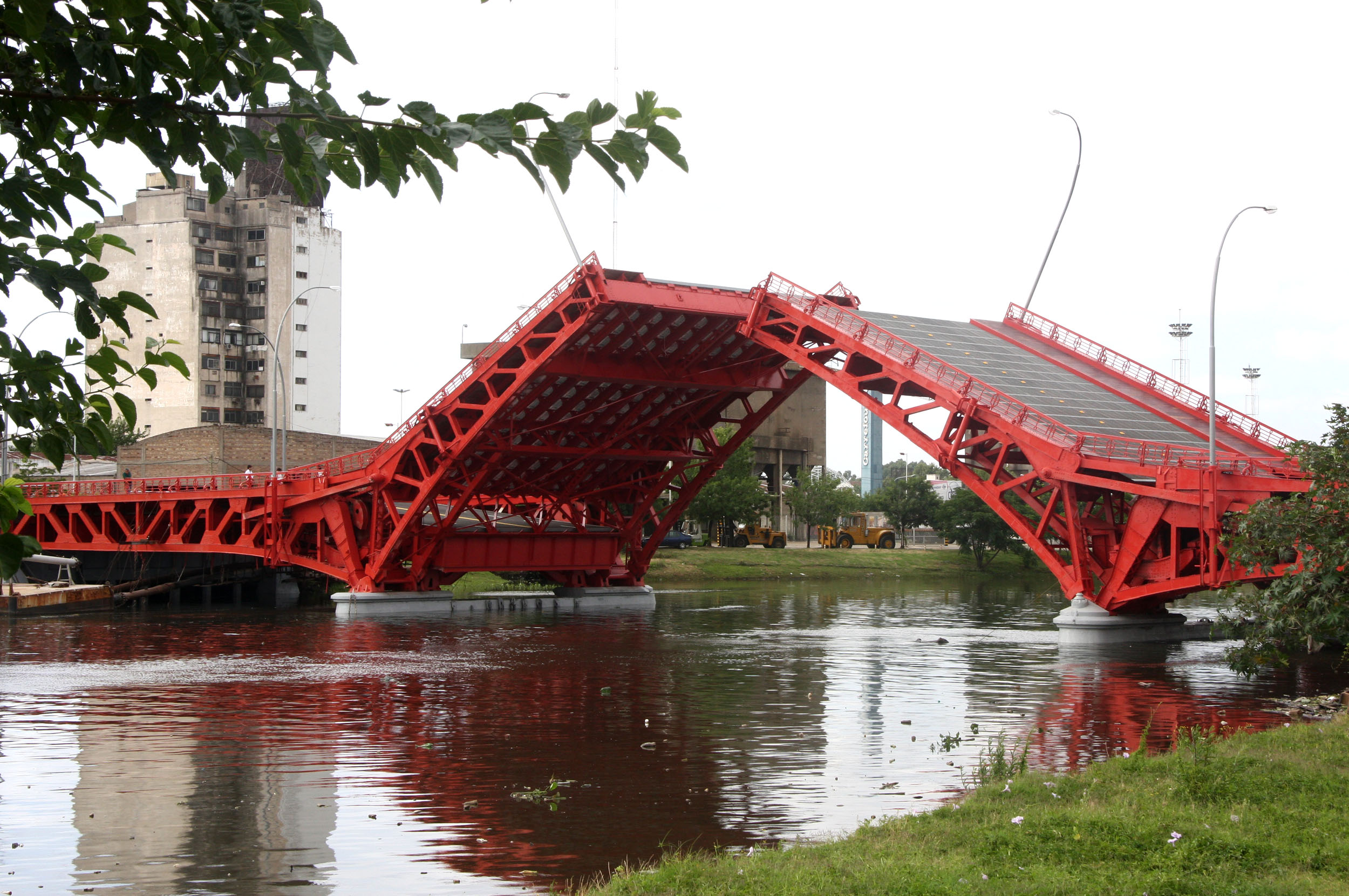
- The bridge in 2011
- Coordinates: 34°39′24″S 58°22′25″W
- Carries: Motor vehicles, pedestrians and bicycles
- Crosses: Matanza River
- Locale: Buenos Aires Province
- Official name: Puente Prilidiano Pueyrredón
- Named for: Prilidiano Pueyrredón
- Maintained by: Municipalities of Avellaneda and city of Buenos Aires
- Preceded by: 1791–1858 (Puente de Gálvez); 1871–1884 (1° Pueyrredón); 1885–1903 (provisional); 1903–1931 (2° Pueyrredón)

Characteristics
- Material: Iron (main structure); Reinforced concrete (columns)
- Width: 1,447 metres (4,747 ft)

History
- Inaugurated: September 20, 1931; 94 years ago (current)

Location
- Interactive map of Pueyrredón Bridge

The Pueyrredón Bridge (officially called Prilidiano Pueyrredón Bridge) is a bascule bridge in Buenos Aires, Argentina. It connects Vieytes street of Barracas neighborhood with Bartolomé Mitre Avenue in Avellaneda Partido, crossing over Matanza River (popularly known as Riachuelo). The bridge carries vehicular, bicycle, and pedestrian traffic between both points. It was named after painter and architect Prilidiano Pueyrredón, one of the country's first prominent artists.

== History ==
=== Puente de Gálvez ===
Since the 17th century the only way to cross the Riachuelo was by canoe. Some of the points to cross the river were Paso Pedro Salazar, named after a neighbor owner of a ranch near there. In 1653 the Cabildo of Buenos Aires ruled the crossing by canoe for public use, becoming the first crossing to connect both margins. It would be known as "Paso de la Canoa" since then, and was the place where the first bridge over Riachuelo would be built years later.

On December 1, 1791, the first bridge over Matanza River was inaugurated. It stood over the Paso de la Canoa in Camino Real al Sud (currently Montes de Oca Avenue in Barracas, Buenos Aires). Juan Gutiérrez Gálvez was in charge during its construction. At the beginning, the bridge would be made of stone, cal and brick but it finally was made of wood due to the lack of skilled labour and materials. The bridge was granted in concession to Gutiérrez Gálvez for a period of 5 years, including the maintenance and toll system. Toll's cost was of 2 Reales per loaded carriage and 1 Real per single coaches. Aborigins, mulatto and black people paid half the rates.

The first name given to the bridge was "Puente de Gálvez", then turning to "Puente de Madera", "Puente de Barracas" and "Puente de la Restauración de las Leyes" during the mandate of Juan Manuel de Rosas, where it was also painted in red, the color that identified Federalist Party. After the first British invasions of the River Plate the bridge was set afire to avoid the British to cross although it would be unsuccessful. On December 23, the bridge was opened again.

The Gálvez bridge was destroyed after a Matanza River flooding in 1858.

=== First Pueyrredón bridge and successors ===
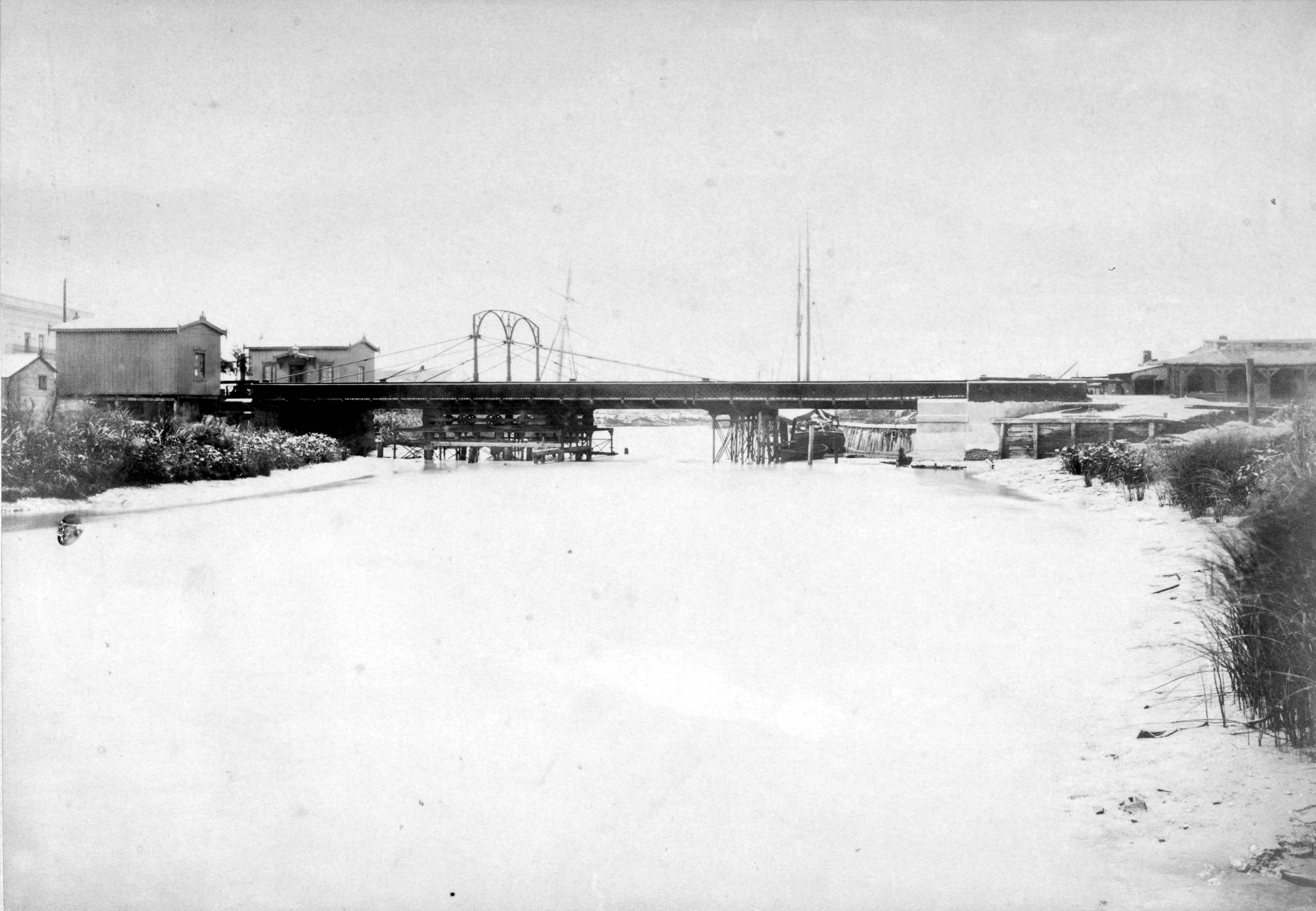
Second Barracas Bridge, designed by Prilidiano Pueyrredón, inaugurated in 1871 and destroyed by the swelling of the river in 1884

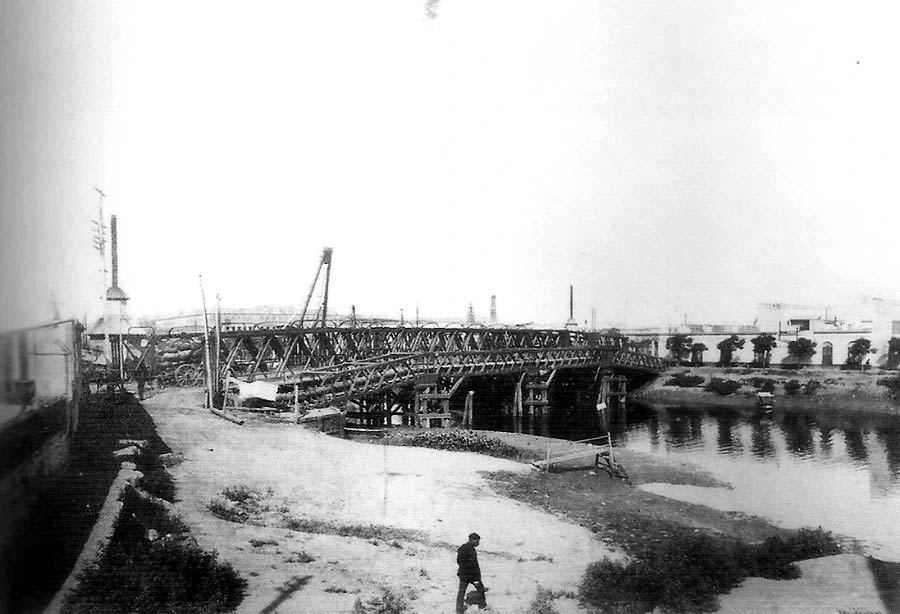
Provisional wooden bridge that replaced the Pueyrredón's structure as seen in 1895. This bridge lasted from 1885 to 1903

Because of the flooding of May 1858 that had destroyed the Barracas (Gálvez) Bridge, artist Prilidiano Pueyrredón (who was also an engineer) offered the government to design an iron bridge with a double-leaf bascule mechanism to allow ships to cruise in case they were higher than it. The government approved the project and granted concession to Pueyrredón and his partners Mr. Medrano, Mr. Panthou and Mr. Escribano. The bridge was finished in 1867. The day it was inaugated the mechanism failed and the bridge collapsed. The entrepreneurs signed a new contract committing to build a new bridge, to be inaugurated in November 1871. As a result of the disaster, Pueyrredón suffered from financial problems and died in 1870, one year before the bridge was opened to public. In memory of Pueyrredón, the Government gave his name to the bridge, finally inaugurated in 1871.

The Pueyrredón bridge lasted only 13 years so it was dragged by the biggest Riachuelo flood on September 23, 1884. It was immediately replaced by a wooden bridge.

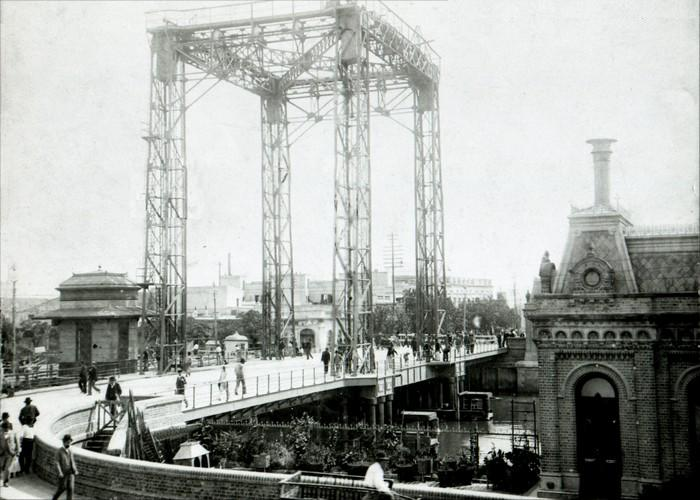
bascule Pueyrredón bridge operated from 1903 to 1931

In 1899 a new bascule bridge made of iron began to be built, being inaugurated in 1903. The bridge added two rail tracks for the trams which use had been spread within Buenos Aires. Because of the increasing traffic of carriages and trams, the construction of a new and bigger bridge was considered necessary by the Government. This third bridge operated until 1931.

On September 20, 1931, a fourth bridge (also bascule) was inaugurated after the precedent one was dismantled. Because of the big amount of vehicular traffic on the bridge (estimated in about 21,000 vehicles per day), the Government set schedules for the spans to be raised to allow big ships to navigate the river. In 1945 the bridge was opened 70 times per month.

The bascule mechanism is no longer use since 1969, due to on December 19, 1969, the New Pueyrredón Bridge was inaugurated. causing the old bridge lost part of its vehicular traffic.

In January 2009 the Pueyrredón bridge was closed to be remodelled, being opened again one year later is spite of the announcements stating that works would last only 6 months.

== See also ==
- New Pueyrredón Bridge
