= Matanza River =

River in Argentina

Coordinates: 34°37′57″S 58°20′46″W

Matanza
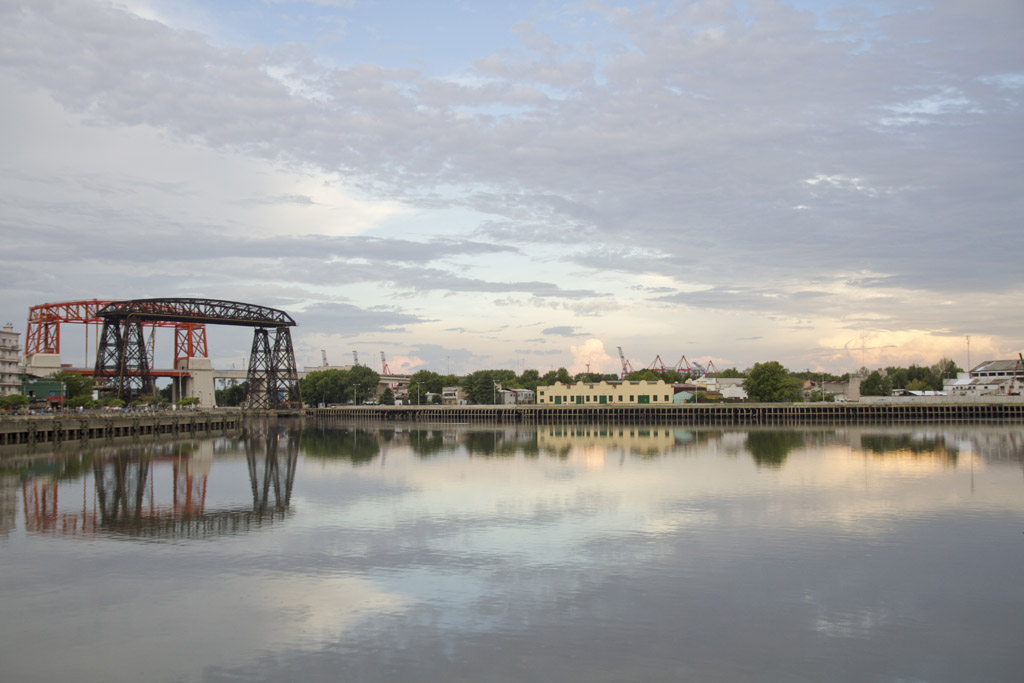

Location
- Country: Argentina

The Matanza River is a 64-kilometre (40 mi) watercourse in Argentina that originates in Buenos Aires Province and defines the southern boundary of the Buenos Aires federal district. It empties into the Río de la Plata between Tandanor and Dock Sud. The La Boca neighbourhood and the Boca Juniors football club are located near its mouth. (The Spanish word boca means "mouth".) The river is highly polluted.

Its course has been canalized and channelized in places, especially along its lower course.

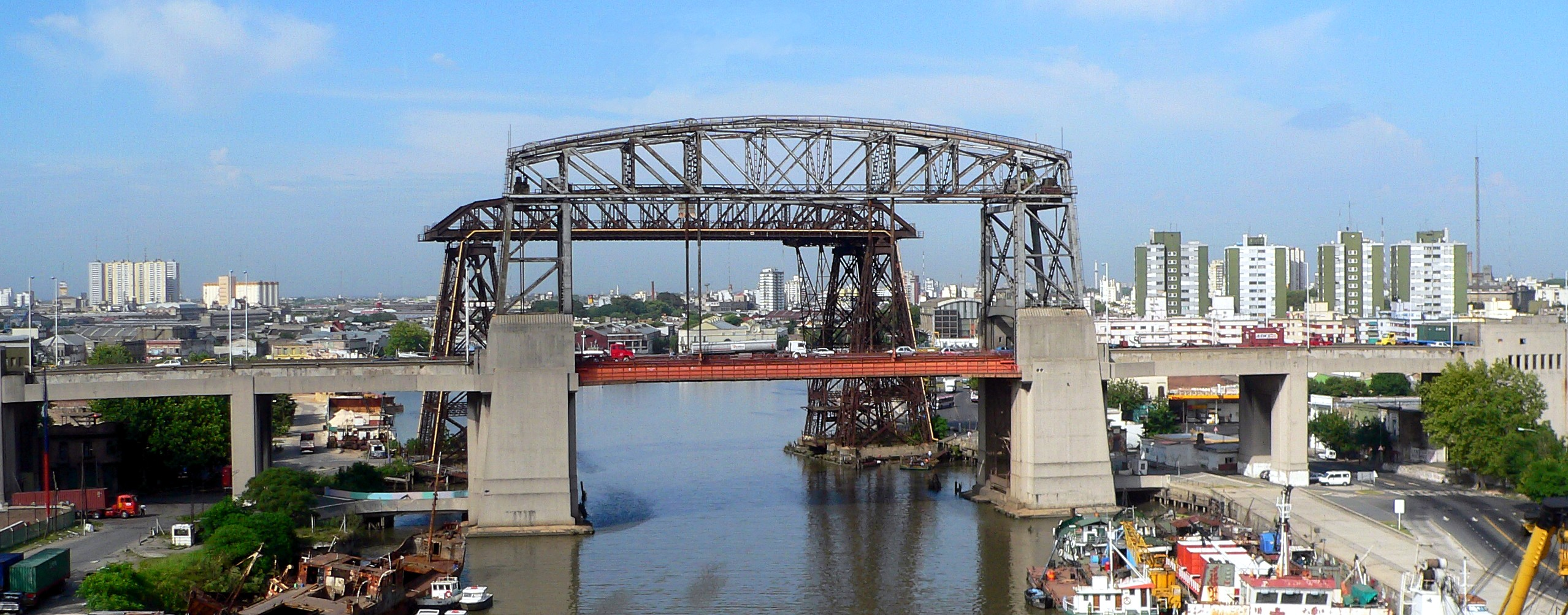
Bridge on Riachuelo-Matanza river

From its source down to La Noria Bridge on Avenida General Paz, the river is usually referred to as Río La Matanza, and from that point onwards as Riachuelo. Approximately 3.5 million people live in its drainage basin of 2,240 km^{2} (865 sq mi).

The south-easterly storm wind, known as Sudestada, hinders the waters of the Riachuelo from reaching the Río de la Plata, producing frequent flooding in low-lying areas like La Boca and Barracas. Since 1995 a number of flood control projects have been carried out to prevent such occurrences.

The Matanza's main tributaries are the Cañuelas, Chacón, and Morales streams in the province of Buenos Aires, and the Cildáñez stream (currently piped) in the Greater Buenos Aires urban area.

== Environmental issues ==
The Matanza basin is the most polluted river in Latin America, and is considered one of the ten most polluted places globally, with very high levels of lead. A main reason is that the river receives large amounts of industrial waste from the numerous factories along the river, especially tanneries. Among the most dangerous contaminants are heavy metals and waste water from the basin's saturated layers. 25% of children living in urban slums along the water's edge have lead in their bloodstreams, and even more suffer from gastrointestinal and respiratory illness. A contentious political subject since at least the 1862–68 administration of President Bartolomé Mitre, the Riachuelo's plight has attracted the attention of other public figures, notably artist and Greenpeace activist Nicolás García Uriburu, who planned to dye the waterway green in 1970, and later carried through on World Water Day (March 22) in 2010, to draw attention to the problem.

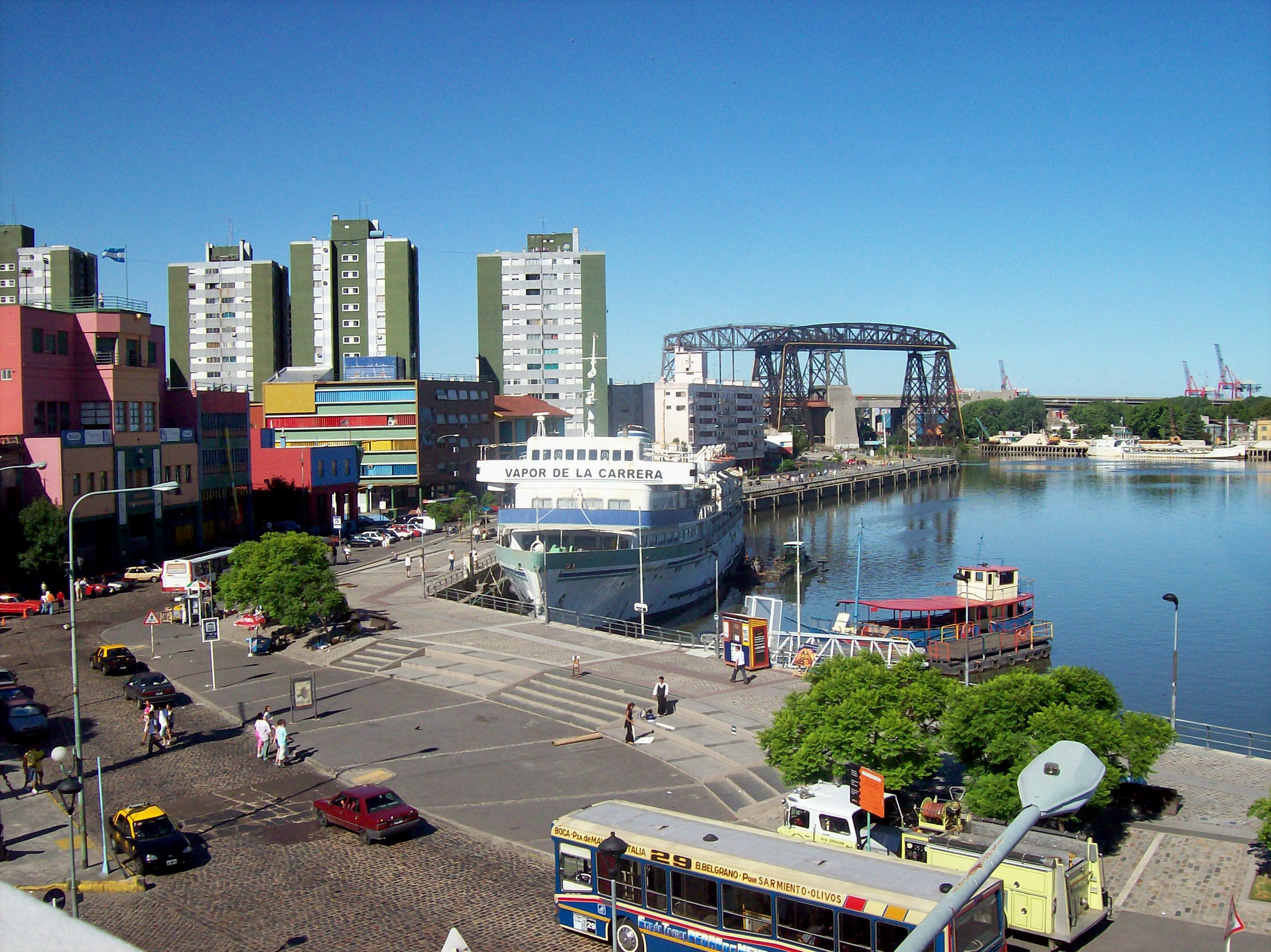
La Boca port

=== 1990's Clean Up Project ===
In 1993, President Carlos Menem's Secretary of Environment, María Julia Alsogaray, presented a 3-year project to clean up the Riachuelo that was approved, but never started, let alone concluded. Alsogaray was later prosecuted for misappropriation of the project's public funds.

According to Argentine newspaper Página/12 in 2006, of the 250-million-US-dollar budget, only US$90 million remained; $6 million were lost in punitive interest, $150 million were destined to unrelated social projects, and only $1 million was used for the actual cleanup. Critics have also noted that this cleanup was in vain, as all that was done was to remove sunken ship hulls, but nothing was done to prevent newly abandoned ships from sinking. A period of optimism regarding the waterway's condition followed announcements in 2006 by President Néstor Kirchner that the Riachuelo's improvement would be prioritized; but, though some efforts were undertaken, the river remained a source of health problems and urban blight for its adjoining neighbourhoods. Environmental cleanup efforts have been supplemented by urban renewal proposals for the area.

=== Supreme Court lawsuit ===
In 2004, a group of residents of the Matanza basin, living in one of the worst-polluted urban slums, filed a case before the Supreme Court of Argentina, against the national government, the provincial government, the municipality, and several private companies. The case was named the Mendoza case, after Beatriz Mendoza, one of the residents filing the case. They were asking compensation for the environmental damages they faced as a consequence of the environmental contamination of the river, and they required the halting of contamination activities. In July 2008 the Argentinian Supreme Court issued its decision, recognising the federal government's liability, together with the city and province of Buenos Aires, for the environmental damages in the river. The Court recognised the residents' right to a healthy environment and that the governments had to repair the damage. The Court ordered the governments to: (a) improve the quality of life for the people living in the area, (b) remediate the ecological damage of the basin and (c) prevent further contamination. However, the Court did not issue any decision with regard to the private companies involved. Five NGOs that had been active in the case - including Greenpeace - were also involved by the Court, that appointed them as patrols for the river and surrounding areas, to control how the improvements and works planned for the river basin were carried out.

== See also ==
- List of rivers of Argentina
