= Raúl Barragán =

Argentinian hacker

Raúl Horacio Barragán
- Born: c. 1957; Concordia
- Died: August 1, 2013 (aged 55–56); Concepción del Uruguay
- Known for: hacking the telex system from SITA

Raúl Horacio "Yuyo" Barragán (c. 1957–2013) is considered to be the first Argentinian hacker, despite not knowing how to program.

Born in Concordia, he worked as a salesman for Aerolíneas Argentinas when he discovered the gateway through SITA's system. He used his telex to generate free airline passages and began making money by selling them on the black market after being fired from the company in 1979.

Many details from his life are not known. He was arrested by the Federal Police of Brazil and the Argentine Federal Police, avoiding conviction both times. It is also known that he assisted the Argentine Air Force during the Falklands War.

Yuyo was preventatively arrested in May 1994 on suspicion of illegally selling passages for the band Los Pericos. He spent three years in jail as he was already being processed in other legal cases.

After his release, he lived with his mother in Concepción del Uruguay and died at 56 years old.

== Work on Aerolíneas Argentinas ==
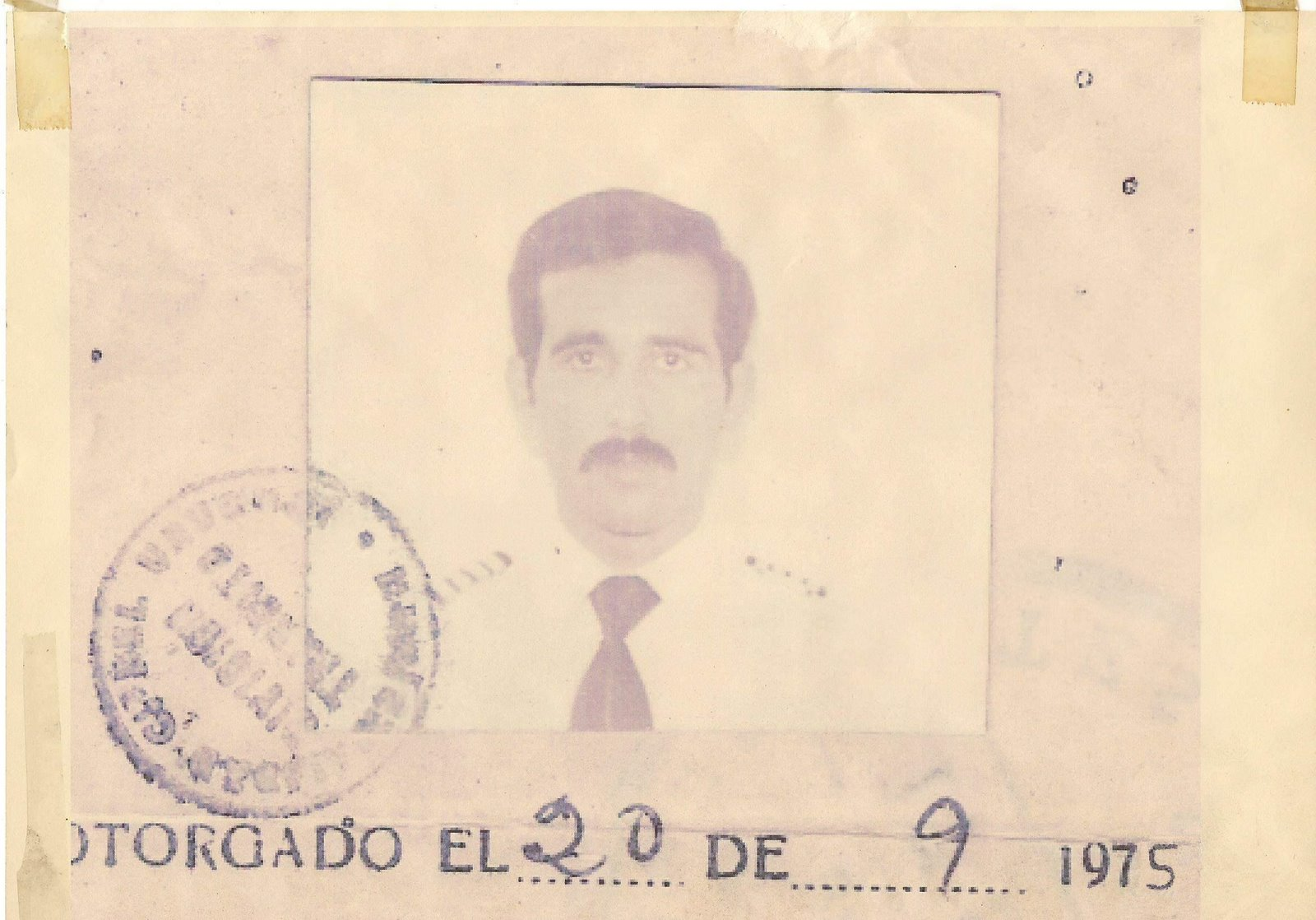
A picture of Yuyo from 1975

Yuyo was born c. 1957 into a prominent family in Concordia, but was raised in Concepción del Uruguay.

Yuyo worked as a salesman for the Concordia branch of Aerolíneas Argentinas. He had a telex directly connected with Santa Fe, but it often didn't work. One day, he received an order for the delivery of several passages and a large sum of cash. The goods were to go to Buenos Aires, and from there they were to be sent to London. As he was going to receive a commission for the trip and communication with Buenos Aires was down due to an overload of orders from the World Cup, he directly asked SITA, the company responsible for issuing airline tickets worldwide, for the confirmation codes. He received the confirmation in minutes. After realizing the breach in SITA's system, he tested his new access by creating a flight from New York supposedly bought with a pre-paid boleto, and it was immediately approved.

In 1978, Yuyo was named manager. He was engaged to a Colombian woman who worked for Aerolíneas Argentinas in Caracas, and he wanted to meet her every week. He did have the right to take some free flights, but he did not feel that the allowance was large enough. He asked his superior for more flights, but his request was denied. He then sent a message to his superior asking for permission again and hacked the telex system to create a record showing that a message had also been sent to the general manager in Buenos Aires, Juan Carlos Pellegrini. A few days later, he sent a fake message to his boss, supposedly signed by the general manager, giving him permission to take the flights that he wanted.

== Life as a hacker ==
In 1979, Yuyo was fired and he reopened his travel agency, Bahía Compañía Internacional de Viajes, in his hometown, but the new business didn't work out. He was sentenced to one and a half years in jail for not having the money for the liquidation process, but as this was his first run-in with the law, he didn't have to serve the sentence.

Afterwards, Yuyo made a living by selling airline tickets. He created authorizations to issue airline tickets, usually for first-class seats, through one airline in the name of another. Yuyo obtained the tickets for free and gave them away or sold them at a 30–40% discount. The price was paid six months later during the clearing process between the companies. The scheme was not detected due to the low value of the passages compared to other expenses. He also attempted a number of activities to punish Aerolíneas Argentinas. One day, he arranged for a flight to depart with only 20 real passengers. He had also taken flights and used the airway system as he wished. It is not known exactly how much money Yuyo earned from this hack, but it is estimated that he generated 5,000 to 10,000 passages and profited roughly 5 million dollars.

There are many stories about Yuyo's life, and it is hard to distinguish reality from myth. On one occasion, Yuyo and a friend were spending a weekend in Brazil, but they had no money and all the banks were closed. Yuyo generated two first-class passages to Tokyo, and they came back when the banks were open. He also allegedly entered a drinking competition with a Russian ambassador, in which they drank so much vodka that they both went into alcoholic comas. He also supposedly used a fake Colombian passport to rent a car that was never returned. According to a source interviewed by Damián Kuc, Yuyo supposedly helped paramilitaries from Costa Rica with fake airline tickets and briefly dated Freddie Mercury. He used to take Lexotanil and Valium.

During the Falklands War, Yuyo cooperated with the Argentine Air Force. His role during the conflict is unknown, but there are rumors that he generated chaos in the United Kingdom, including by creating fake passages on UK airlines. There is a single official document dated 2 November 1982 in which the Air Force sends its regards to Yuyo for his work.

In 1982, Yuyo created a flight ticket from Rosario to Tel Aviv, but the KLM manager detected the fraud and cancelled it. Yuyo then fled to Brazil and kept his operations running by forging passages from Varig, but this time selling them at half price on the black market. In 1983, the brother of a prostitute he was friends with went to Varig to confirm the authenticity of his passage to Chicago, and Yuyo was arrested by the Federal Police of Brazil. The company agreed to release him if he showed them his modus operandi. Yuyo agreed to meet them the next day in a hotel, and he gave two passages and a compensation check to the police officer for his good work. He then hacked Varig again and came back to Buenos Aires on a flight from San Pablo; his check bounced. He was banned from Brazil because of the incident.

In February 1983, Yuyo was paid for a passage with a Rolex watch, but it was broken, so he left it in a repair shop. When he came back to collect it, the clerk asked for the receipt, and the Argentine Federal Police arrested him. Yuyo argued that he had obtained it through an airway passage, but he didn't work for the airport or a travel agency, and the police grew suspicious of him. On 3 March, he confessed to his crime and demonstrated his modus operandi using a telex machine from Interpol. The police warned the airway companies of the hack, but they took no action because they did not want to admit that their systems were vulnerable. Four days later, the police were obliged to release him. After his confession, all of the world's airlines met in Paris to make decisive changes to SITA's system. They changed all the codes, imposed verification messages, and decided to end clearing operations every 32 days.

== Arrest ==
On 23 July 1993, the band Los Pericos flew from Jamaica to Miami, but when they arrived in the United States, their passages for the return trip weren't with them yet. Yuyo said someone he trusted was on his way to deliver the tickets, but the airplane was leaving in minutes. The band asked the airport to announce Yuyo's name over the loudspeaker. The man delivering the tickets thought he had been caught and tried to flee, which led to the band members also being caught. Their manager, Pablo Hortal, revealed Yuyo's name to the Argentine Federal Police. During the trial, none of the members of the band recognized Yuyo, and the passages had been issued in the United States, a country where he was banned because of his activities. Yuyo was also suspected of using fake credit cards to buy the tickets. In May 1994, Judge Juan José Galeano ordered his preventive detention. He was detained at Unit 16 of Caseros Prison. According to Yuyo, he wanted to regularize his residency certification for voting purposes, and the airlines used the opportunity to have him arrested. His arrest was also related to his other legal issues, including the liquidation process of his company in 1979 and a case brought by Aerolíneas Argentinas in 1982 for fraud against the public administration. The latter case was not decided until 28 December 1994, when he was sentenced by Martín Irurzun to 6 months in jail. His sentence was considered served after he left jail in the Los Pericos case. Yuyo's bank accounts in London were blocked, preventing him from using them during the trial and leaving him with no money during this period. During his time in prison, he started attending law school.

== Life after jail and death ==
Yuyo was released in 1997 after three years in jail and disappeared from public life. A YouTube channel named yuyo3260 became known for posting several recent pictures of Yuyo after his release, mostly depicting his travels. On 6 March 2009, the channel published a video in which Yuyo allegedly said he had been betrayed by a good friend and was going to die soon. He died on 1 August 2013 in Concepción del Uruguay. In his last days, Yuyo was living in his mother's house, using morphine for pain, and needing a wheelchair to get around.

== Cultural impact ==
Yuyo is considered to be the first hacker from Argentina, even though he did not know anything about programming. He is recognized as such by other hackers, including Daniel Sentinelli, and has appeared several times on the Susana Giménez talk show wearing a balaclava.

The 1995 book Llaneros Solitarios - Hackers, la Guerrilla Informática (Espasa-Calpe), written by Raquel Roberti and Fernando Bonsembiante, includes a chapter about Yuyo's life.

== Bibliography ==
- Roberti, Raquel; Bonsembiante, Fernando (1995). "Sucesos Argentinos". Llaneros Solitarios - Hackers, la Guerrilla Informática (in Spanish). Espasa-Calpe. ISBN 978-950-852-075-3.
