= SITA (business services company) =

Global technology leader specialising in the air travel industry

- Industry: Technology for global air travel industry (airports, airlines and baggage handlers)
- Founded: 1949; 77 years ago
- Headquarters: Geneva, Switzerland
- Area served: Over 200 countries and territories
- Key people: David Lavorel (CEO)
- Services: Airport Management Systems; Passenger processing; Biometrics; Border management; Baggage Management; Communications services; Data services; Cockpit communications and aircraft operations; Cabin communications; Cargo operations
- Revenue: US$1.6 billion in 2024
- Owner: More than 400 member owners
- Number of employees: 4,468
- Subsidiaries: Aviareto, CHAMP Cargosystems, SITA FOR AIRCRAFT. Recent acquisitions include baggage technology leader Materna IPS, airline flight Operations Control Center managed service ASISTIM and master systems integrator CCM.
- Website: www.sita.aero

SITA is a multinational information technology company providing IT and telecommunication services to the air transport industry. SITA is an acronym for Société Internationale de Télécommunications Aéronautiques. SITA is 100% owned by industry partners. It's literally a ‘society’ – owned by around 400 members, including airlines, airports, and other stakeholders.

The company provides its services to around 400 members and over 2,500 customers worldwide – which it claims is about 90% of the world's airline business. Around the world, nearly every passenger flight relies on SITA technology.

The business has three key divisions covering air travel sectors:

– SITA at Airports provides technology for Airport Management and Airport Operations, Passenger Processing including Biometric Travel and Facial Recognition, and Baggage Management including the WorldTracer suite of products.

– SITA Communications and Data Exchange (CDE). SITA CDE operates one of the world's largest private data networks. It handles around half of the Air Travel Industry (ATI) data, covering around 600 airports and linking around 1,800 aircraft.

– SITA at Borders provides immigration and security support at airports and major border crossings to 80+ nations including all of the G20. The aim is to help governments, airlines and airports optimise risk management (such as terrorist threat and cross-border crime) and balance the needs of passenger experience for low risk travellers, border efficiency and airline operations. Services include Traveler Data, Passenger Information (API), Advance Passenger Processing (APP), Digital ID, and Advance Risk and Threat.

== History ==
Original 11 founders of SITA

SITA or Société Internationale de Télécommunications Aéronautiques, was founded in February 1949 by eleven airlines in order to bring about shared infrastructure cost efficiency by combining their communications networks. The eleven original airlines were: British European Airways Corporation (BEAC), British Overseas Airways Corporation (BOAC), British South American Airways (BSAA), KLM, Sabena, Swissair, TWA, Swedish A.G.Aerotransport, Danish Air Lines, Norwegian Air Lines and Air France.

=== World-wide computer network ===
SITA opened its first telecommunications centre in Rome in 1949. Information was manually transmitted using perforated tape and teleprinters. This was the 'first generation' of the network. The 'second generation' SITA High-Level Network (HLN) became operational in 1969, handling data traffic in real time via a message-switched network over common carrier leased lines. It was organised to act like a packet-switching network. The 'third generation' Data Transport Network adopted X.25 in 1981, providing global coverage and becoming the world's "largest" public data network.

=== Expansion ===
In 1989 computer reservations systems, aerospace manufacturers, tour operators, airfreight forwarders, airport authorities, and other organizations in the air transport industry began joining SITA as members. The company today provides infrastructure and communication services for the air transport industry, having evolved from its early days of providing only network-related services.

SITA presently operates in over two hundred countries and territories, and its customers include airlines, airports, airfreight — international freight forwarders, travel and distribution — global distribution systems, governments, aerospace, ground handlers and air traffic control.

From 2011 to 2015, SITA provided services to Mahan Air, Caspian Airlines, Meraj Airlines and Syrian Arab Airlines, companies designated as Specially Designated Global Terrorists by the United States Department of the Treasury. In February 2020, SITA agreed to pay US$ 7.8 million to the US Treasury as settlement and announced further enhancements to their compliance program.

== Company structure ==
SITA is owned by members of the air transport industry, who make up the SITA Board and SITA Council. The company has the remit of working with the air transport community for the benefit of all members. This includes cooperation with industry bodies, such as IATA, ACI and regional associations, aiming to solve common industry issues through the use of IT and telecommunication services, through development of community systems, industry standards and shared infrastructures for aviation. SITA also produces industry surveys including the Air Transport IT Insights, Passenger IT Insights, as well as working jointly with IATA on the industry’s Baggage Report.

SITA FOR AIRCRAFT

Launched in 2005 as OnAir, SITA FOR AIRCRAFT today provides Digital Day of Operations, Cabin Connectivity Services, and Unified Aircraft Communication. OnAir combined with SITA's Aircraft business in 2015 and is now SITA FOR AIRCRAFT but was previously known as SITAONAIR.

=== Subsidiaries ===
CHAMP Cargosystems

CHAMP became a fully owned SITA subsidiary at the start of 2022, as an IT company working solely in the air cargo industry, providing services for carriers and distributors. In November 2011, CHAMP acquired TRAXON Europe, an electronic air cargo company, in order to prepare for new International Air Transport Association (IATA) initiatives such as IATA e-freight and Cargo iQ.

Aviareto

Aviareto is a joint venture between SITA and the Irish government. Aviareto and the International Civil Aviation Organization (ICAO), the Supervisory Authority of the International Registry, agreed that Aviareto would establish and operate the International Registry of Mobile Assets.

== Products and services ==
SITA's services include:

- Airport operations, including total airport management, safety and security
- Aircraft operations, including operational communications, e-Aircraft services * e.g. for EFBs), and in-flight communications
- Baggage processing
- Cargo operations
- Communications & data exchange
- Passenger processing
- Border management

SITA's shared infrastructures include systems for passenger processing.

== Standards ==
SITA works with around 20 industry bodies and standards committees to set standards. The company has approximately 40 participants in 55 different Standards Setting Working Groups. The organizations SITA works with include IATA, Air Cargo Inc., Airlines for America, ICAO and the FAA, plus AAAE, ACC, Association of European Airlines, CANSO, OpenTravel Alliance, ITU, the World Customs Organization and the World Trade Organization. The Working Groups SITA is involved in include IATA Type X, IATA Common Use, ATA e-Business, ICAO AFSG, ACI ACRIS and Eurocontrol SWIM. Examples of standards include:

- Messaging (ADS-B, Type X communications, Aero-ID and common-use self-service)
- Traceability (AutoID)
- Transportation security (Border Management data hub)
- Passenger Management (Common Use Passenger Processing System — CUPPS)

== Research and development ==
The company's achievements include:

- First iPad kiosk to sell tickets
- First augmented reality application for an airline
- Managing passenger flow at airports through geo-localization
- In-flight mobile portal developed with OnAir
- World's smallest full-function check-in kiosk
- CUPPS (Common Use Passenger Processing System) technology, a replacement for the CUTE (Common Use Terminal Equipment) check-in and boarding standard used today. SITA worked with IATA and other bodies to introduce this capability, which will save the air transport industry millions of dollars.
- SITA works with business partner Orange Business Services on joint projects, and is also involved with the industry research programs e-Cab, Total Airport, SWIM, and SESAR. Additionally, the company focuses on institutional and academic research through teams at MIT, Cambridge and Montreal Universities.

== Security breaches ==
Raúl Barragán is considered the first Argentine hacker for invading SITA telex system on the 70s while working for Aerolíneas Argentinas. In 1979, he was fired from the company, and from there on, he made a living by selling first class passages in the black market. Raúl has demonstrated his modus operandi to the Argentine Federal Police using a telex from Interpol, and showed several flaws from SITA's system that he used to explore. Raúl was arrested in May 1994 for supposedly selling passages for the Argentine band Los Pericos. It is not known how much money he got, but it is estimated he generated from 5 to 10 thousand passages, profiting about 5 million dollars. According to Fernando Bonsembiante and Raquel Roberti, because of his actions, in 1983 SITA changed all their codes, imposed verification messages and decided to end clearing operations every 32 days.

On 24 February 2021, Star Alliance data stored on SITA's US servers were stolen in a cyberattack. The affected companies were Malaysia Airlines, Finnair, Jeju Air, Cathay Pacific, Air New Zealand, Lufthansa, United Airlines and others. Singapore Airlines announced half a million membership number and tier status were compromised. Three months later, Air India announced that names, credit card details, date of birth, contact information, passport information, ticket information, Star Alliance and Air India frequent flyer data from 4.5 million passengers was stolen on the incident.
