= Museo de la Fundación Rómulo Raggio =

Museum in Vicente López Partido, Buenos Aires, Argentina

Coordinates: 34.5275°S 58.4753°W

The Museo de la Fundación Romulo Raggio is a museum located in Vicente López Partido, Buenos Aires, Argentina.

The museum is operated by the Rómulo Raggio Foundation. It is housed in a 5,600-square-metre (60,000 sq ft) 1930 neoclassic palace that has been declared of municipal interest.
