= La Salle Florida =

Coordinates: 34.52639°S 58.49978°W

Instituto La Salle Florida
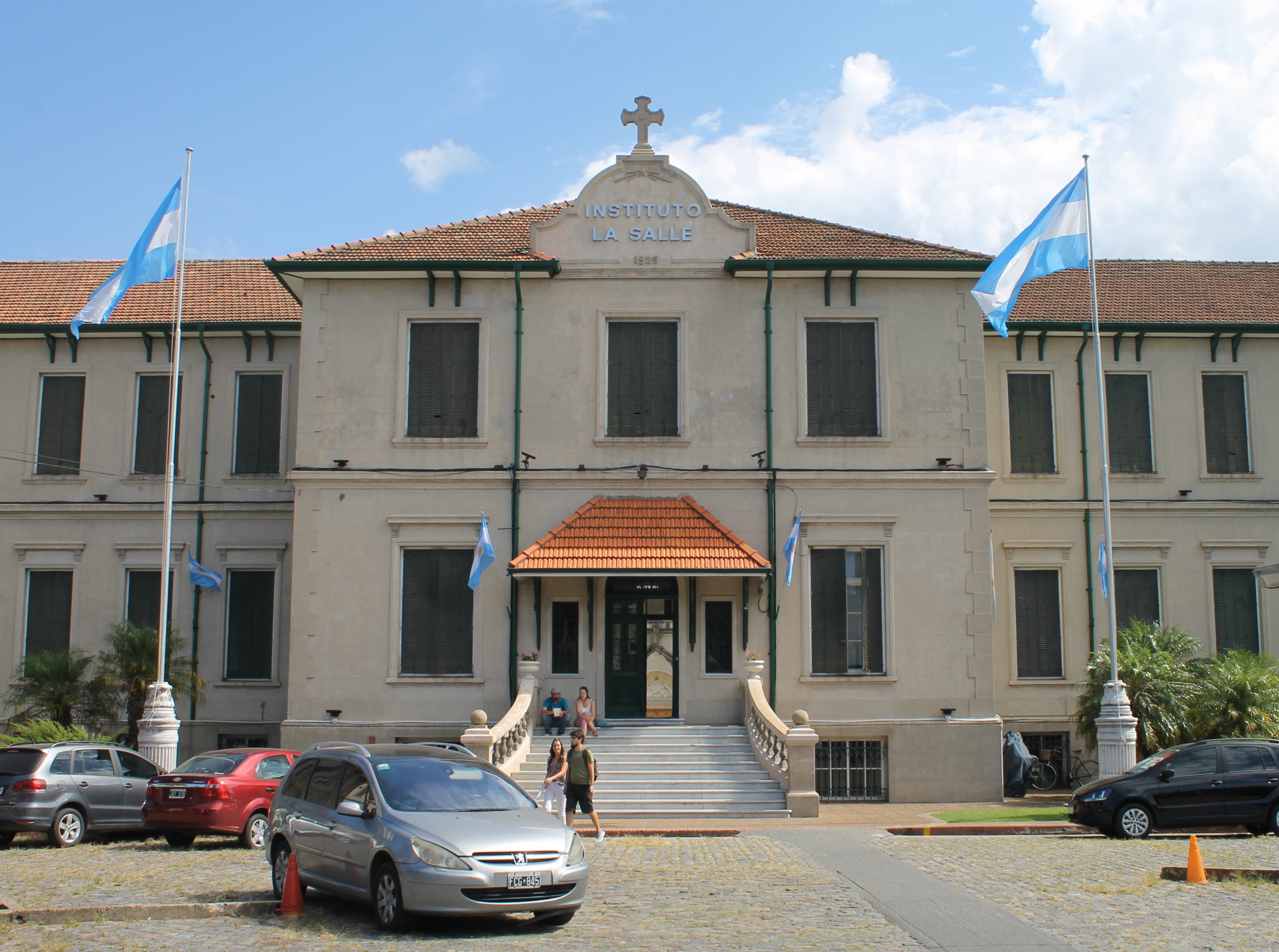

Location
- Florida, Vicente López, Buenos Aires; Argentina

Information
- Religious affiliation(s): Catholicism
- Established: 1934; 91 years ago
- Gender: Boys (formerly); Mixed (currently)
- Affiliation: De La Salle Brothers

The Instituto La Salle Florida is an Argentine private school founded in 1934 and located in Florida, Vicente López Partido, Buenos Aires Province. Although it is managed by lay people, it belongs to the Institute of the Brothers of the Christian Schools, a Roman Catholic religious teaching congregation created by French priest and educational reformer Jean-Baptiste de La Salle in 1680.

Originally established as a boys-only school, nowadays both male and female students attend classes. It offers early childhood, primary, secondary and tertiary education.

In recent years, the school has organized a marathon in order to raise funds for charitable purposes.

== Notable alumni ==
- Carla Rebecchi, Argentine field hockey world champion
- Hernán Crespo, Argentine association football Olympic silver medalist
- Claudio Bonadio, Argentine judge
- Florencia Kirchner, daughter of former Presidents of Argentina Néstor Kirchner and Cristina Fernández de Kirchner
- Matias González Pena, outstanding chemist representative of Argentina at the International Chemistry Olympiad in 2017, held in Nakhon Pathom, Thailand. Olympic Bronze Medalist.
