= Olivos, Buenos Aires =

Olivos
- District
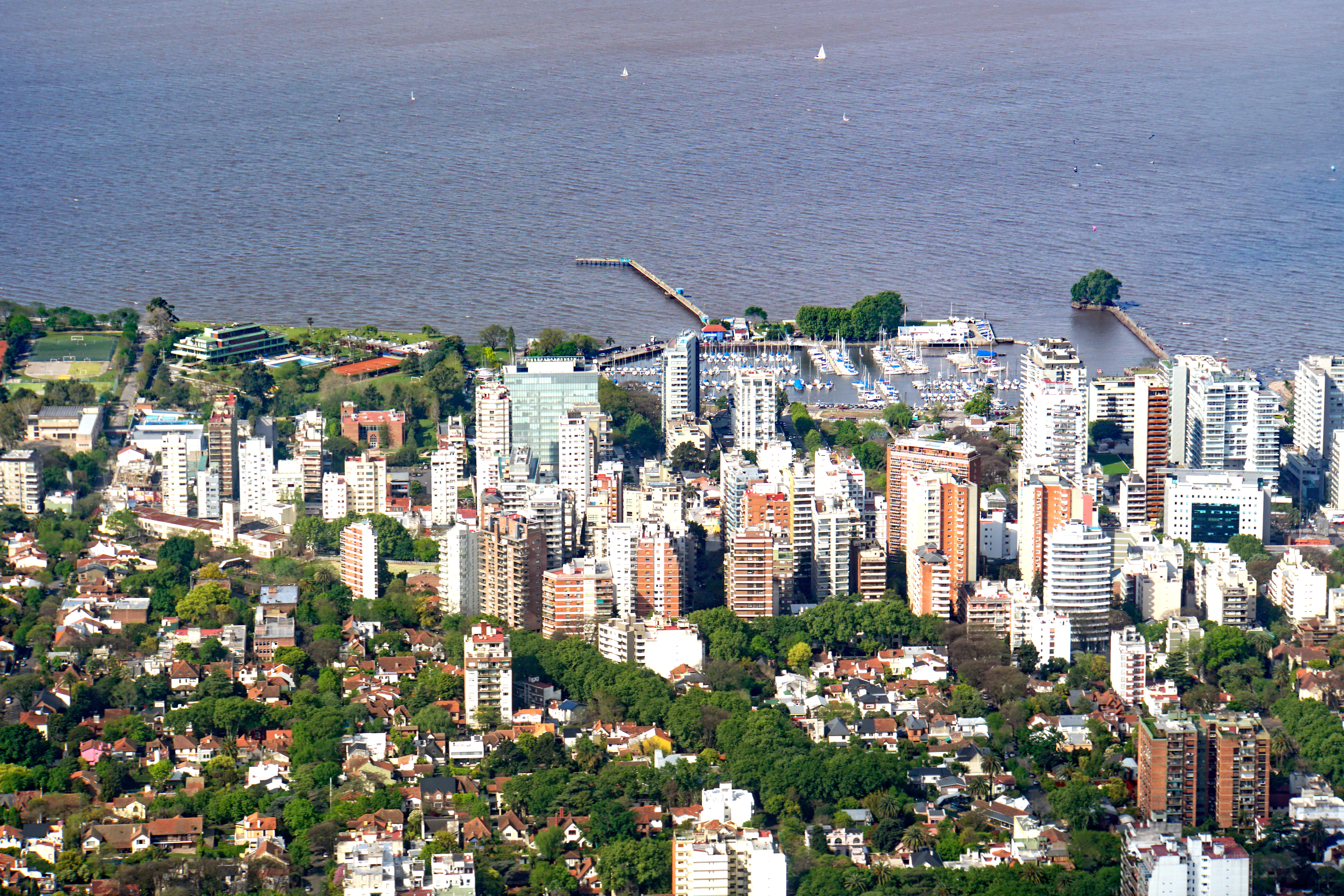
- Aerial view

- Location in Greater Buenos Aires
- Coordinates: 34°30′S 58°29′W
- Country: Argentina
- Province: Buenos Aires
- Partido: Vicente López
- Founded: 1870

Government
  - Intendant: Soledad Martínez
- Elevation: 18 m (59 ft)

Population (2001 census [INDEC])
  - Total: 75,527
  - Density: 9,808.7/km^{2} (25,404/sq mi)
- CPA Base: B 1636
- Area code: +54 11

Olivos is a neighborhood in Vicente López Partido, Buenos Aires Province, Argentina. It is bordered to the south by Vicente López neighborhood and Florida; to the east by the River Plate; to the north by La Lucila and Martínez, and to the west by Munro.

Olivos is the municipal seat of Vicente López Partido, and it is also seat of the Argentina presidencial residence.

== History ==
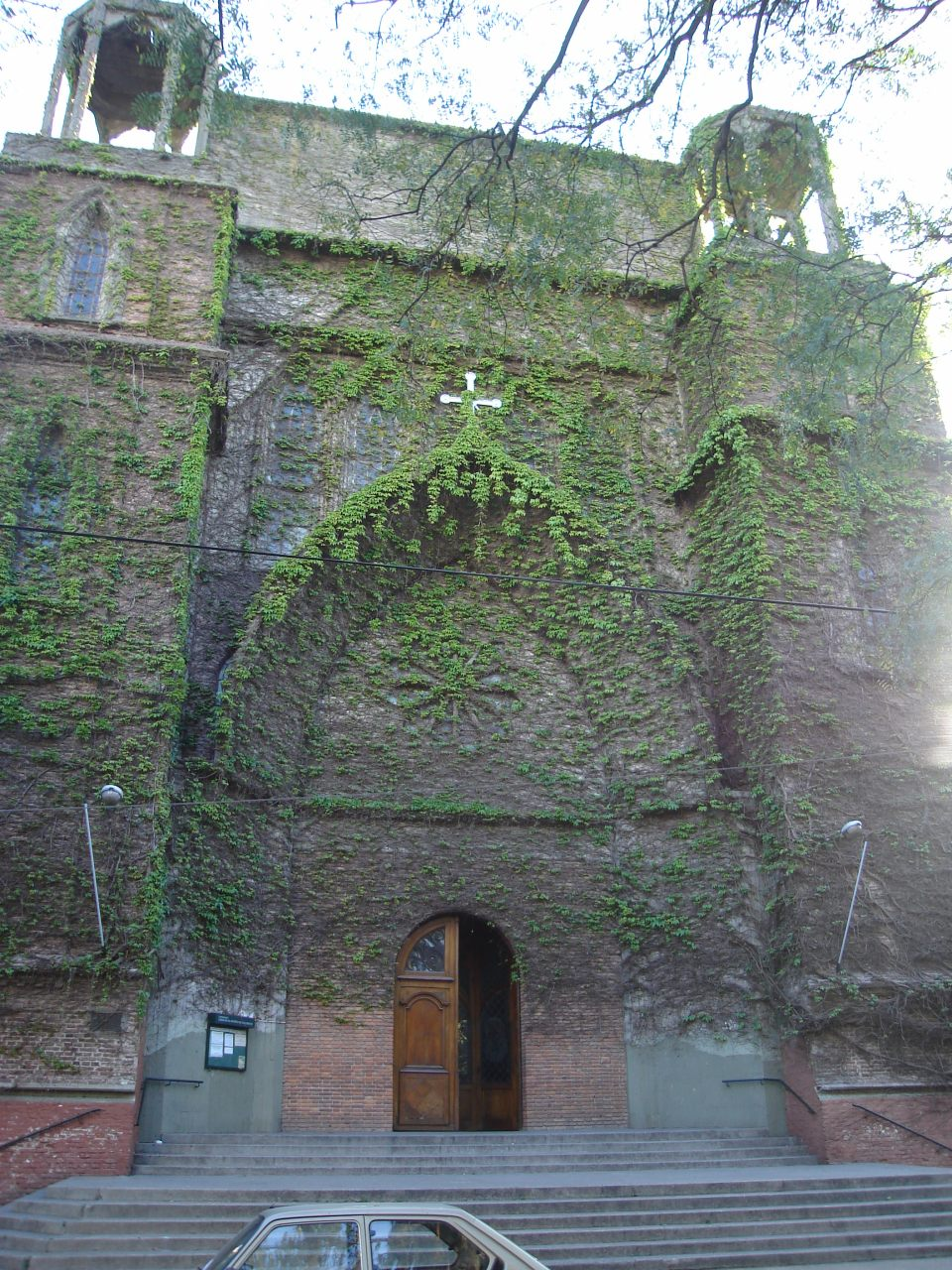
Church of Jesus in the Mount of Olives. (Parroquia Jesús en el Huerto de los Olivos).

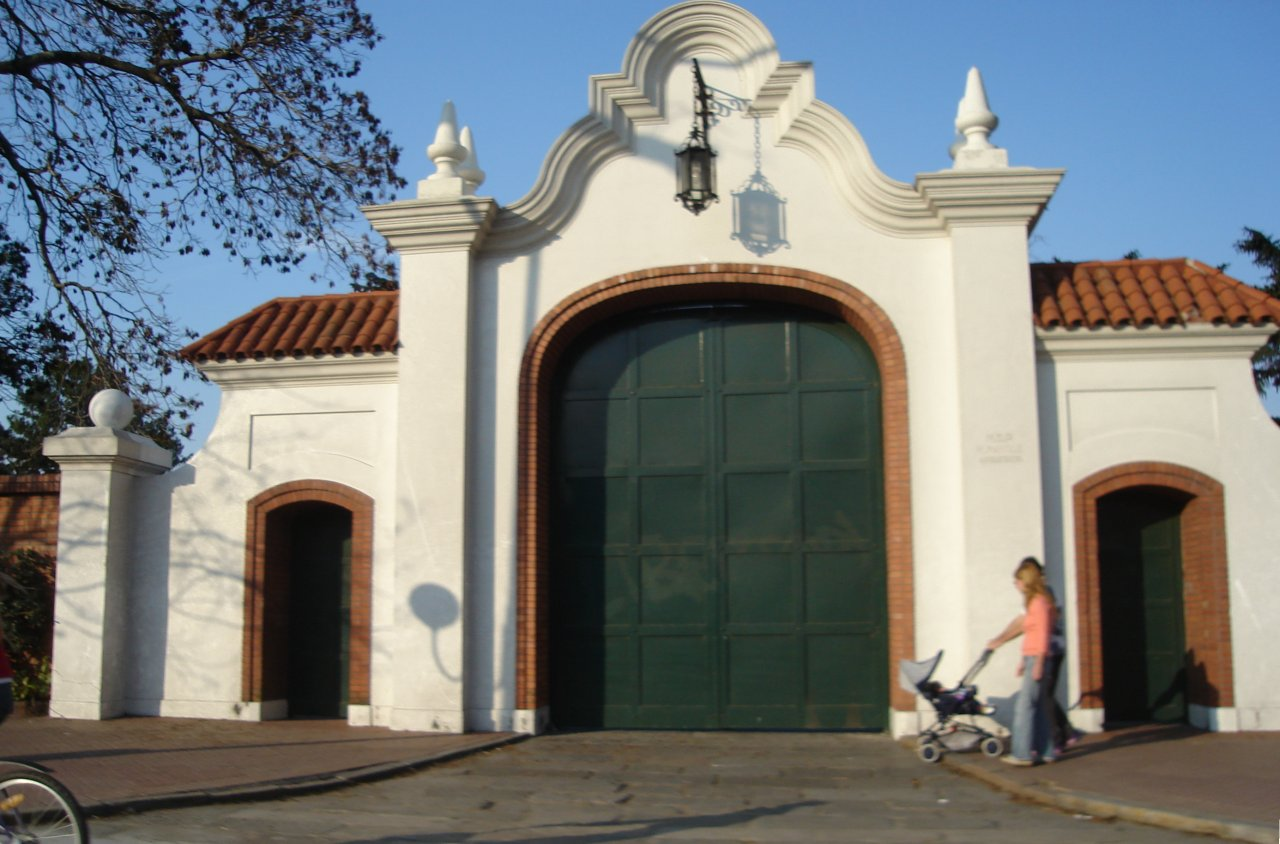
Main gates of the Official Presidential Residence, Olivos.

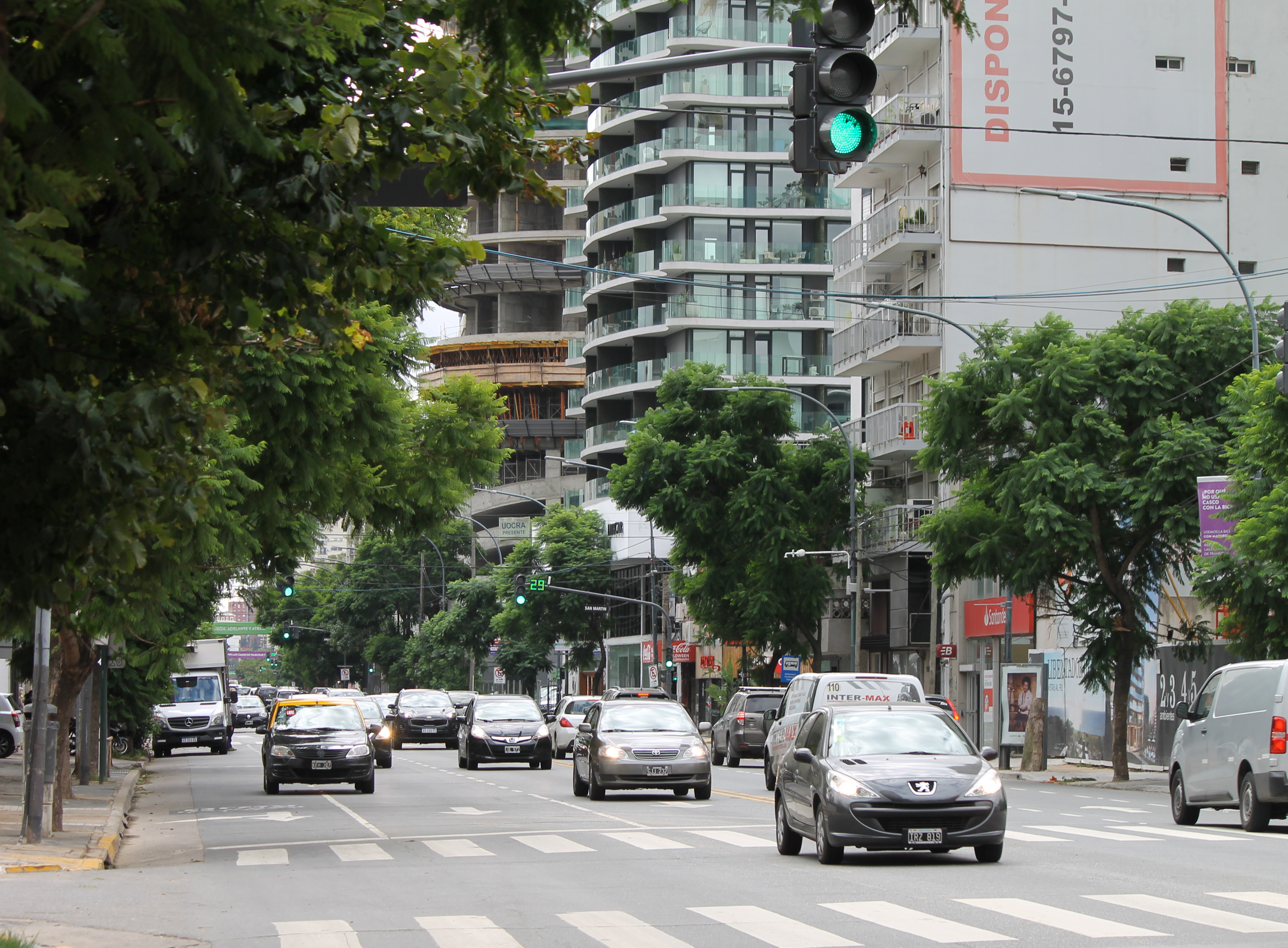
Avenida del Libertador, Olivos.

A well-known stop along the Buenos Aires-Córdoba trade route for much of the 18th century, one of the area's first landowners, Domingo de Acassuso, began cultivating olive trees around 1720 and the spot was officially named Olivos ("Olive Trees") on 19 February 1770. Much of the area was later purchased by Viceroy Antonio de Olaguer y Feliú and by a German immigrant, Hernán Wineberg, who sold a large tract in 1860 for the construction of the Ferrocarril Central Argentino through the area.

The 1863 inaugural of the local railway station, one of Argentina's first, began attracting homeowners drawn by the area's tranquility and convenient access to the rapidly growing capital and, in 1897, the Church of Jesus of the Olive Trees was consecrated. A 1905 edict subdivided San Isidro Partido in two, creating the modern Partido de Vicente López and designating Olivos as the seat.

Home to a growing upscale community by 1917, local businessman Rodolfo Negrete founded the city's first clinic and marina and, during the 1920s, the small marina was modernized and the city's streets paved. The opening of National Route 9 in the mid-1930s, west of the city, further accentuated the area's draw as a convenient suburb for Buenos Aires commuters.

The city became the focus of national attention in 1941 when, upon the passing of Carlos Villate Olaguer (a great-great-grandson of Viceroy Olaguer y Feliú's), a 35 hectares (86 acres) section of the family's local land was deeded to the national government for use as the president's official residence. Graced by a mansion of an eclectic, Italianate-inspired style, the main house was commissioned by Miguel José de Azcuénaga in 1851 and designed by renowned local artist and architect Prilidiano Pueyrredón. The complementing structures for the compound were built in variations on Baroque architecture.

The residence hosted the Olivos Pact, a political agreement signed on 14 November 1993 between then-President Carlos Menem and former President Raúl Alfonsín (head of the main opposition party, the centrist Radical Civic Union). The pact secured support for constitutional reforms allowing for the re-election of the President well as for the popular election of the Mayor of Buenos Aires, hitherto an appointed post. The Kheyvis nightclub fire of 20 December 1993 in Olivos was the deadliest such tragedy in Argentina up to that time. Olivos was selected as a stop along the Tren de la Costa tourist railway upon the line's opening in 1995.

== Geography ==
Olivos is located on the western bank of the Río de la Plata, the world's widest river. The river is approximately 50 km (31 mi) wide at Olivos, and as such, Uruguay is not visible from ground level. However, Olivos (and this entire region of the Rio) do not have sandy beaches; the shoreline is relatively rocky. Comparable shorelines include those of the Great Lakes in North America. The city's topography is relatively flat. However, there are some ridges by the river towards the north, in the La Lucila neighbourhood.

The city is located about 22 km (14 mi) north of Buenos Aires, of which it is effectively a suburb, and 270 km (168 mi) south of Rosario. Montevideo, capital of Uruguay is 180 km (112 mi) due east of Olivos, across the river.

=== Climate ===
Olivos has an oceanic climate (Cfb). The city has comfortably warm summers and cool winters. Temperatures are noticeably more moderate than in places further inland, or even in nearby Buenos Aires, due to the lack of an urban heat island. Rainfall is fairly consistent throughout the year.

Climate data for Olivos (1981–2010, extremes 1888–present)
Month	Jan	Feb	Mar	Apr	May	Jun	Jul	Aug	Sep	Oct	Nov	Dec	Year
Mean daily maximum °C (°F)	26.4 (79.5)	25.4 (77.7)	23.3 (73.9)	20.4 (68.7)	18.6 (65.5)	15.6 (60.1)	14.7 (58.5)	15.2 (59.4)	17.9 (64.2)	19.9 (67.8)	21.7 (71.1)	24.5 (76.1)	20.7 (69.3)
Mean daily minimum °C (°F)	15.6 (60.1)	15.3 (59.5)	14.0 (57.2)	12.2 (54.0)	10.3 (50.5)	8.8 (47.8)	8.1 (46.6)	9.1 (48.4)	10.3 (50.5)	11.8 (53.2)	14.2 (57.6)	14.9 (58.8)	11.7 (53.1)
Average precipitation mm (inches)	94.3 (3.71)	93.2 (3.67)	95.5 (3.76)	85.3 (3.36)	64.5 (2.54)	57.9 (2.28)	53.7 (2.11)	52.9 (2.08)	56.3 (2.22)	86.3 (3.40)	81.1 (3.19)	92.2 (3.63)	925.2 (36.43)
