= Americans in Argentina =

Ethnic group in Argentina

American Argentines
Americano-argentinos (Spanish)
- Population pyramid, according to the 2022 Argentine census.

Total population
- 5,000 or 60,000

Regions with significant populations
- Mainly in Buenos Aires and Córdoba

Languages
- Spanish • English

Religion
- Roman Catholicism • Protestantism

Related ethnic groups
- White Americans; American Brazilians; Canadian Americans; Uruguayan Americans

There is a community of Americans living in Argentina consisting of immigrants and expatriates from the United States as well as their local born descendants. There are roughly 5,000 or 60,000 Americans living in the country.

== Migration history ==
From 2002 to 2003, many Americans migrated to Argentina when the country suddenly became comparatively inexpensive to the United States.

Immigration from the United States increased further during and after the 2008 financial crisis as many Americans fled the crisis-ridden United States to escape to Argentina. A few interviews and immigration data show a 12% increase in the number of Americans (742) who applied for permanent residency in 2008.

== Education ==
American schools in Argentina include:

- Asociación Escuelas Lincoln (Buenos Aires)

== Notable people ==
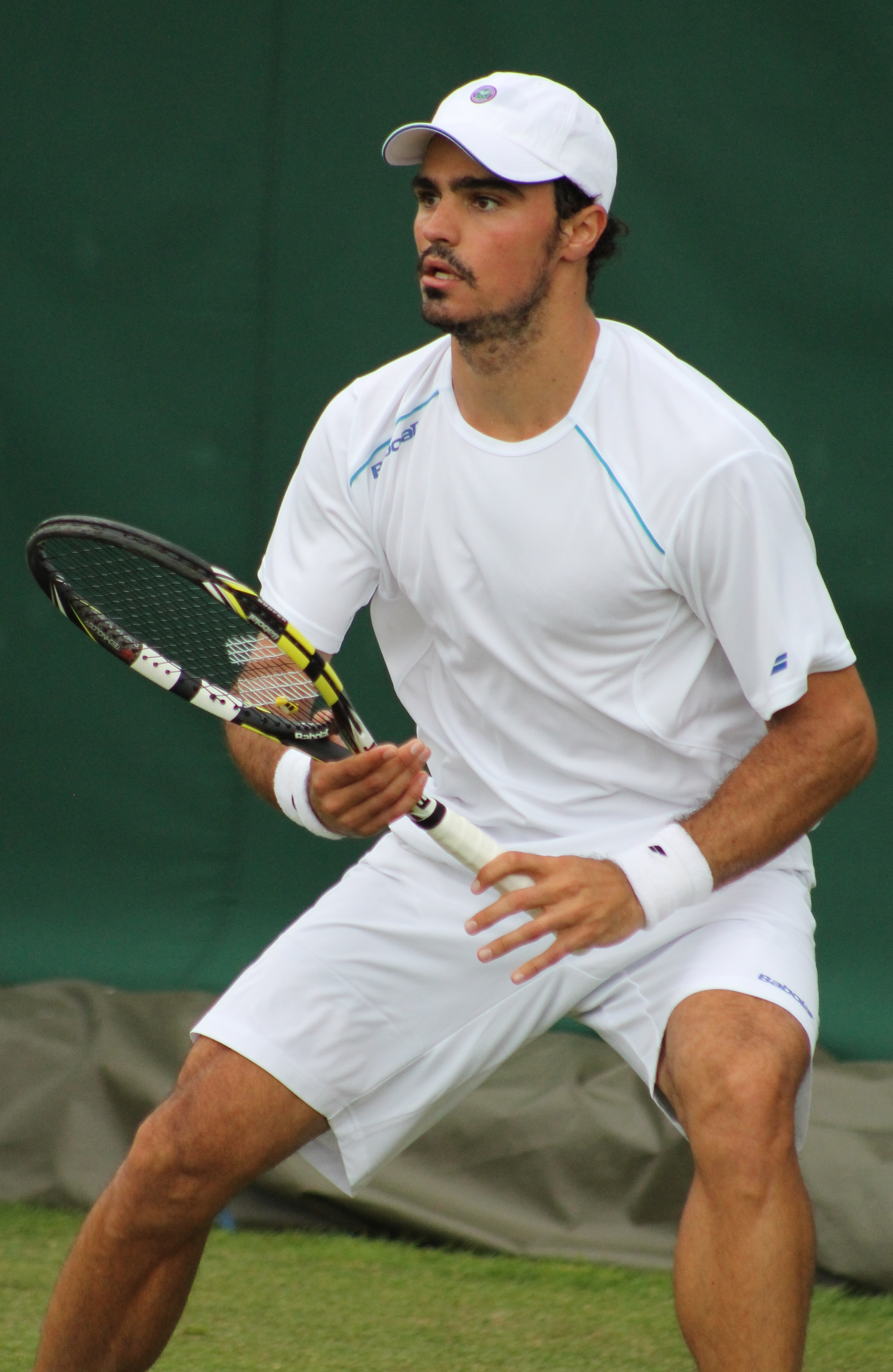
Andrea Collarini is an American Argentine tennis player.

- Guy Williams (1924–1989), actor
- Adrián Suar (born 1968), actor, producer, and businessman
- Amán Rawson (1792–1847), physician and merchant, politician
- Andrea Collarini (born 1992), tennis player
- Benjamin Apthorp Gould (1824–1896), astronomer
- Bernhard Dawson (1890–1960), astronomer
- Tranquilo Cappozzo (1918–2003), rower and Olympic champion
- Charles Dillon Perrine (1867–1951), astronomer
- John M. Thome (1843–1908), astronomer
- Jonas Coe (1805–1864), naval commander
- Bryan Gerzicich (born 1984), football player
- Dan Newland (born 1949), journalist, translator, and writer
- Kevin Johansen (born 1964), rock musician
- Maxine Swann (born 1969), fiction author
- Melville Sewell Bagley (1838–1880), businessman and creator of Hesperidina, the unofficial Argentine national liqueur
- Renato Corsi (born 1963), association football player
- Richard Maury (1882–1950), railway engineer and designer of the iconic Tren a las Nubes train service
- Richard Shindell (born 1960), folk songwriter
- Roy Cortina (born 1964), politician and President of the Socialist Party in Buenos Aires
- Viggo Mortensen (born 1958), actor
- William Henry Hudson (1841–1922), author, naturalist and ornithologist
- Jorge Newberry, aviation pioneer

== See also ==
- Argentina–United States relations
- Argentine Americans
