= Asociación Escuelas Lincoln =

Location
- Vicente López Partido, Buenos Aires Province; Argentina; 34°29′31.11″S 58°28′55.28″W

Information
- Type: Private
- Established: 1936
- CEEB code: 900150
- Faculty: 116 full-time faculty members
- Grades: PK–12
- Enrollment: 620
- Campus size: 9 hectare
- Campus type: Suburban
- Colors: Blue; Yellow
- Athletics: Soccer, basketball, volleyball, swimming, and tennis.
- Athletics conference: South American Activities Conference, Agrupacion Deportiva Escuelas del Norte, The Friendship Games
- Affiliation: NEASC AMISA IB DIEGEP AAIE SENIA AmCham EPEA Eco Schools Argentina Asociación Civil de Rectores y Coordinadores Colegios del Bachillerato Internacional del Río de la Plata (ACCBIRP)
- Website: https://www.lincoln.edu.ar

Asociación Escuelas Lincoln is an international school located in La Lucila, a residential neighborhood in the Vicente López Partido district north of the city of Buenos Aires, Argentina. The school has class sizes of 15–22 students and is the only US-accredited school in Argentina. Many of its students have parents that work for embassies or international companies.

== Curriculum ==
The curriculum integrates both American and International school systems, enabling all students to earn a North American-accredited diploma. Additionally, students have the opportunity to obtain an Argentinian diploma and pursue the International Baccalaureate.

== Sports ==
The school's mascot is the Condor. The school is a member and the creator of SAAC (South American Activities Conference), in which it takes part in football (soccer), basketball, volleyball, swimming and SAAC Fine Arts.

== Lincoln clubs and organizations ==
- Chess
- Legos
- Fab Lab
- Yearbook
- Eco Team
- MUN
- Robotics
- Programming
- Math Counts
- Rock Band
- Condor Council
- Dance
- Union El Ceibo
- Big Band
- Theater Play
- Musical
- Community Action
- Pottery
- Math Competition Prep
- Ukelele classes
- Silent Reading Club
- Prom
- Condor Study Circle
- Movie Club
- DIY Club
- HS GSA
- Community Workouts
- HS Student Council
- French Club
- Track & Field

== See also ==
- Americans in Argentina
