= Damián Kuc =

Argentine YouTuber and podcaster

- Born: c. 1996; Resistencia
- Occupations: YouTuber; podcaster; comedian; businessman

Instagram information
- Page: Damián
- Years active: 2013–present
- Followers: 494 thousand

X information
- Handle: @DamianKuc
- Years active: 2010–present
- Followers: 181 thousand

YouTube information
- Channel: Historias Innecesarias
- Years active: 2018–present
- Genre: True crime
- Subscribers: 2.43 million
- Views: 520 million
- Last updated: May 3, 2026

Damián Kuc (born c. 1996) is an Argentine YouTuber, podcaster, comedian and businessman. He became known for publishing true crime stories on his YouTube channel Historias Innecesarias.

== Early life ==
Damián was born in c. 1996, in Resistencia. According to him, he was a shy kid and has always used the internet extensively, spending a lot of time with computer games and following Argentine YouTubers and comedians, including El Bananero, Marito Baracus, Paulina Cocina, Navaja Crimen, Ramita and Rada. He's also watched several Argentine TV series, including Pura Química and Caiga Quien Caiga. He was prone to having hyperfocus on several subjects, including ornamental plants and arachnids. He has also smoked weed since the 5th year of the secondary school. He has studied social communication and criminalistics for a year, but gave up on both graduations.

== YouTube career ==
After quitting college, Damián briefly worked as a cashier at his family's cotillón. He then enrolled in a stand-up comedy course and started performing. He created his Instagram account to become known in the stand-up scene. His first video was about his dog, Minerva. He then began publishing stories he read on Wikipedia, often accompanied by his dog. He changed the focus of his videos when he heard about the Tita and Rhodesia case on Ingame, Santiago Maratea's questions and answers Instagram series, and posted his original research on his Stories. From there on, he created a series called Historias Innecesarias, where he published 15 second videos about curiosities. The YouTuber Paulina Cocina convinced him to upload his videos on YouTube, and he transferred his channel to the platform on 26 November 2018. He began posting videos exclusively for YouTube in January 2019.

His main focus were videos about criminal cases and criminals in Argentina, including the AMIA bombing, Cromañón nightclub fire, Ramallo massacre, Schoklender case, García Belsunce case, the murder of Solange Grabenheimer, the Puccio family, Malevo Ferreyra and Robledo Puch. He has also published videos about international crimes, including about the Manson family, Patty Hearst, the Peaky Blinders and the Catholic Church sexual abuse cases. According to him, the video that he had researched the most was about Raúl Barragán.

Damián became one of the most successful Argentine YouTubers. In June 2022, his channel had more than 1.5 million subscribers and 238 million views. His channel became specially popular during the COVID-19 pandemic and after his appearance on the radio program Últimos Cartuchos, where he got several followers on his Instagram account. His most viewed video was about the Bank Rio robbery. He was not only popular in Argentina, but also in other Spanish-speaking countries, such as Paraguay.

His first videos were uploaded every Sunday and were three minutes long on average, but he began producing true crime documentaries, that ranged between 10 and 30 minutes, with some being more than 40 minutes long. He's also published Historias Innecesarias Express, a series of short trivias, and Hobbies Innecesarios, about his hobbies.

On 25 November 2020, Damián tweeted he didn't want to make a video about death of Diego Maradona, as he was "more interested on the economy of Rwanda". After his tweet, some of his viewers tried to cancel him and he received a wave of offenses. In June 2021, he made a series of videos on Instagram about an expedition he made at Monte Constanza Natural Reserve to release an anaconda. He ended up being bitten by the snake.

Damián has expressed his wishes to end his channel several times, and in January 2023 he announced on Facebook he would not upload videos anymore. According to him, he decided to stop because the routine had worn him out. He further said he would still be active on the internet and announced a new podcast. He produced more than 300 videos up until the end of his channel. On 3 December, he uploaded the last video on his channel, a special episode about the full story of Pity Álvarez. His channel is currently active.

In 2025, he and Paz Varales were part of an opened talk on the 11th MóvilFest.

== Other projects ==
Damián appeared once a month on FiloNews, every 15 days on Últimos Cartuchos and occasionally on History Channel. He was the voice actor for Revista Anfibias' podcasts, including Basta Chicos: La vida de Ricardo Fort, La One: La Vida de Moria Casan and one chapter of Reality Fiction deticated to Guido Süller. He also co-hosted, together with Paula Echevarría, the live music program Picnic en el Piso Doce.

After closing his YouTube channel, Damián changed his hyperfocus to fungus and started microdosing psilocybin and attending to teraphy to treat his anxiety and depression. In September 2023, he and Leandro Di Giovanni co-founded the mushroom burger restaurant Chizpa on Palermo, Buenos Aires.

== Awards ==
Year	Award	Category	Result	Ref.
2021	Coscu Army Awards	YouTuber of the Year	Won	
