= Common-use self-service =

Self check-in kiosk for airlines

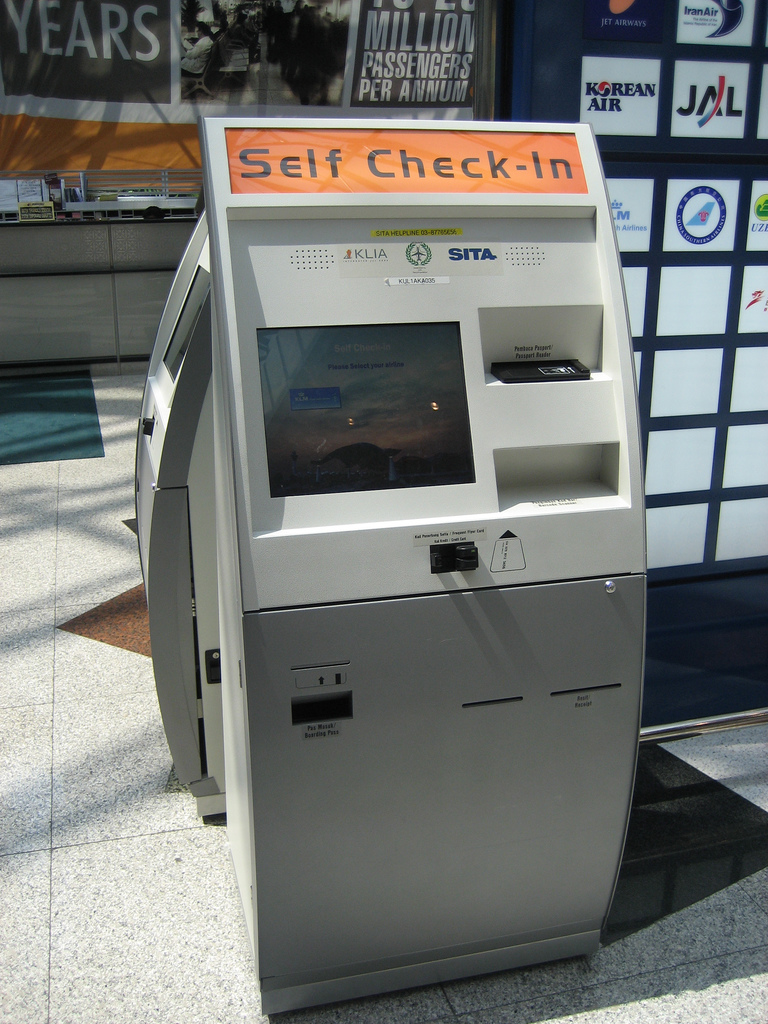
A typical CUSS kiosk installed in Kuala Lumpur International Airport provided by SITA

Common-use self-service or CUSS is a shared kiosk offering airport check-in to passengers without the need for ground staff. The CUSS can be used by several participating airlines in a single terminal.

The first major installation of CUSS for multiple airlines was launched in 2003 in a cooperative project between LAS McCarran Airport, ARINC and twelve participating airlines. British Airways, Singapore Airlines, Royal Dutch KLM and Lufthansa By the end of 2008, CUSS had been implemented at more than 100 airports globally.

== Benefits ==
=== Passengers ===
CUSS can provide easier and faster passenger passage through the airport, due to less queues. CUSS kiosks can be shared by multiple airlines and are located throughout the airport, ranging from car parks to transit areas, thus cutting down airport crowds.

=== Airline and airports ===
Economically, CUSS reduces the labour cost of ground staff required by manual check-in. With the introduction of CUSS, the check-in area at the airport can be reduced to enable more retail outlets, or entertainment facilities. Based on IATA studies, a 40% market penetration of self-service check-in will save $US1 billion per year. CUSS can be implemented in the cloud, optimising resource usage and support overheads, that eliminates the need for servers, core computing space and costly technical manpower.
