= Kheyvis fire =

Fire in Buenos Aires, Argentina

- Date: December 20, 1993
- Venue: Kheyvis nightclub
- Location: Olivos, Buenos Aires, Argentina; 34°30′51.141″S 58°28′36.797″W
- Type: Fire
- Deaths: 17

A fire in the Kheyvis nightclub in Olivos, Buenos Aires, Argentina, killed 17 people and injured 24 others on 20 December 1993. The deceased were teenagers at a graduation party for the La Salle College.
