= Florida, Buenos Aires =

Florida
- District
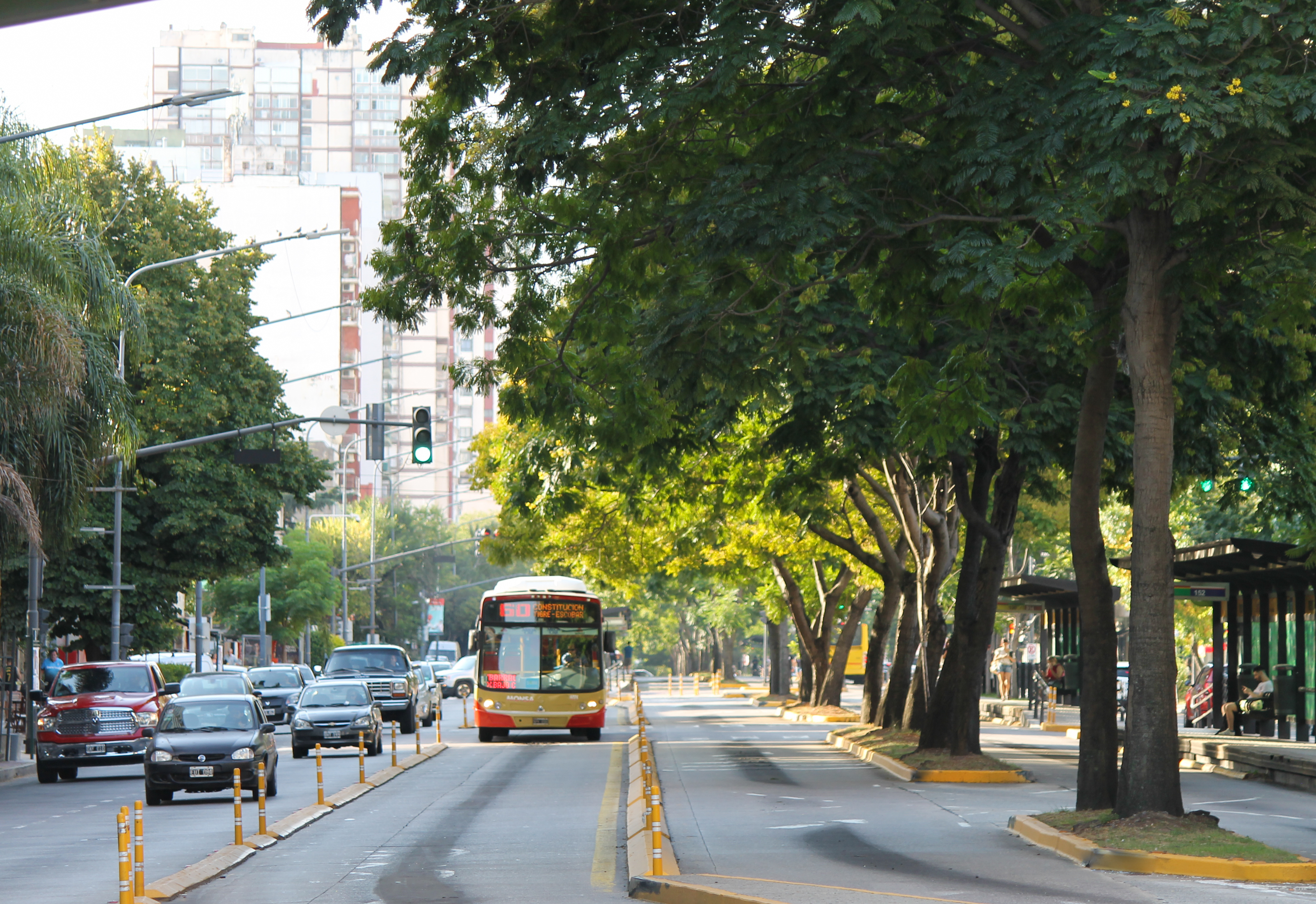
- Maipú Avenue, Florida.

- Location in Greater Buenos Aires
- Coordinates: 34°31′S 58°30′W
- Country: Argentina
- Province: Buenos Aires
- Partido: Vicente López
- Founded: 1891; 135 years ago
- Elevation: 13 m (43 ft)

Population
  - Total: 48,158
- CPA Base: B 1602
- Area code: +54 11

Florida is a neighborhood in Vicente López Partido, Buenos Aires Province, Argentina. The community is a suburb in the Buenos Aires metropolitan area. In 2020 the population was estimated at 48,158, making it the second most populated neighborhood in Vicente López. It is located 15 kilometers north of downtown Buenos Aires.

Florida grew and prospered in the late 1800s when it became a railway stop; the community became progressively more urban and started to receive Italian and English immigrants who set small farms that provided vegetables and fruits to nearby Buenos Aires. Today it is an upper middle class residential area serving as a bedroom community.

It is bordered to the east by Vicente López neighborhood, to the north by Olivos, to the south by the city of Buenos Aires, and to the west by Villa Martelli.

== Location ==
Florida is served by the Mitre and Belgrano Norte railway lines, both providing fast access to the city of Buenos Aires. Its main commercial areas are Maipú Avenue and San Martín Avenue.

=== Transport ===
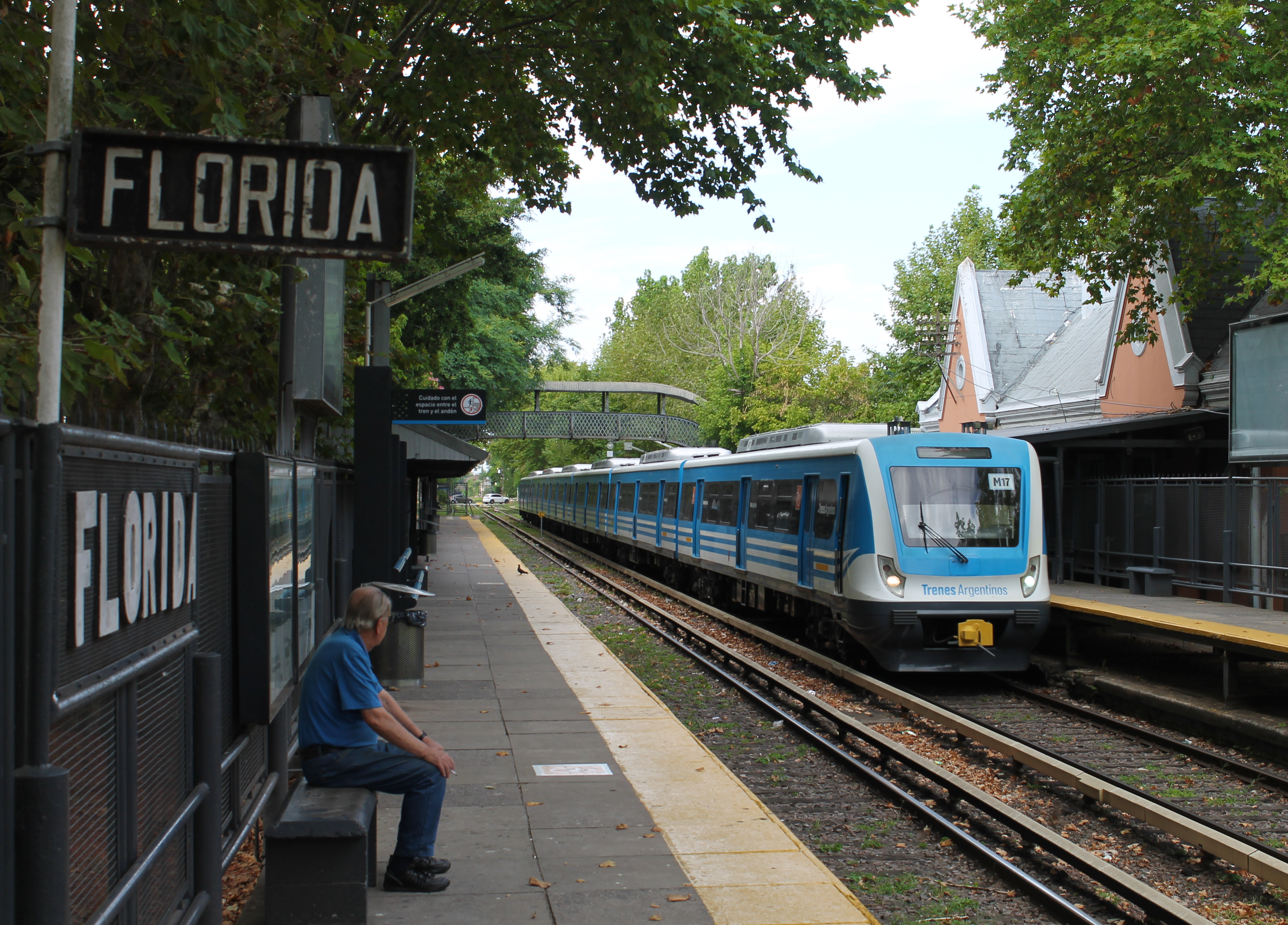
Florida station

Florida is well-connected to the other northern suburbs of the Buenos Aires metropolitan area, and to downtown Buenos Aires, and especially to Jorge Newbery airport.

The neighborhood is connected to the rest of the city by two highways, one Metrobus line, 21 bus lines and four train stations (Aristóbulo del Valle, Florida, Juan B. Justo and Cetrángolo).

== History ==
Florida Este was founded in 1891 when the Buenos Aires and Rosario Railway opened a station in the section from Belgrano that then reached Bartolomé Mitre, Borges and San Isidro. Some versions state that the station (and subsequently the village) was named "Florida" to commemorate a victory over a Spanish army in the Paraje La Florida of Upper Peru on May 25, 1814, during the War of Independence.

The official date of establishment was set by a decree that gave approval to the builder of the railway line to divide the lands into lots for future sale. The date was set on May 7, 1891. Between 1895 and 1915 the "Compañía de los Ferrocarriles Pobladores" and the French Bank, owner of lands in the area, sold them to families that soon arrived.

The Florida Este station was a meeting place for the inhabitants of the districts, with Luis Poggi's general store (located on the corner of San Martín and Fray Justo Sarmiento) as one of the pioneers in the zone. Most of the residential houses were grouped near the station, while the country houses were in what is now Melo street. Small vegetable farms were established near Mitre Avenue.

By Municipal Ordinance, Florida was declared a "village", in 1907. Six years later the bishop of La Plata, Juan Terrero, blessed a precarious chapel built on lands donated by José Antonio Trabucco. The Rossi family donated an image of the Virgin Mary sculpted in Carrara marble in Italy. The first priest of the region was Father José A. Coffa, who was succeeded by Father Vanini, who started works for a construction of the church. The church, finished in 1931, was named "Nuestra Señora de la Guardia", and was the first church in Florida.

On 10 January 2007, 21-year-old student Solange Grabenheimer was found murdered on the floor of her bedroom at a Calle Güemes PH. The case garnered national attention over the indictment of Grabenheimer's best friend and roommate Lucila Frend, who was charged with the murder. Frend was acquitted in 2011, and the case remains unsolved.

== Education ==
In the area there are several educational institutions. According to Vicente Lopez Municipality information in 2017 there were:

Kindergartens

Kindergarten No. 3: Franklin 1785, West Florida. Kindergarten No. 5: Tuyutí 1119, West Florida.3 Kindergarten N ° 8: Santa Rosa 4148, Florida West. Kindergarten No. 10: Aristóbulo del Valle 2375, Florida. Kindergarten No. 13: Melo 1861, Florida.

Primary Education

Manuel Dorrego School, Posadas 1115 - Florida Oeste - Vicente López

Municipal Training Centers

"JORGE LLOBET", Santa Rosa 4146, Florida West Vicente López Community College (CUV)

Private Schools

The area had a German school, Rudolf-Steiner-Schule.

La Salle Florida, a catholic school, it provides all early childhood, primary, secondary and tertiary education.

== Sports ==
Florida Este is home to the Club Atlético Platense, established in 1905, which hosts a wide range of sports. Their football team plays in the AFA. Platense's home ground is Estadio Ciudad de Vicente López.

Another club in the neighborhood is Sportivo Balcarce, which played in Primera División in the 1920s.

== Gallery ==
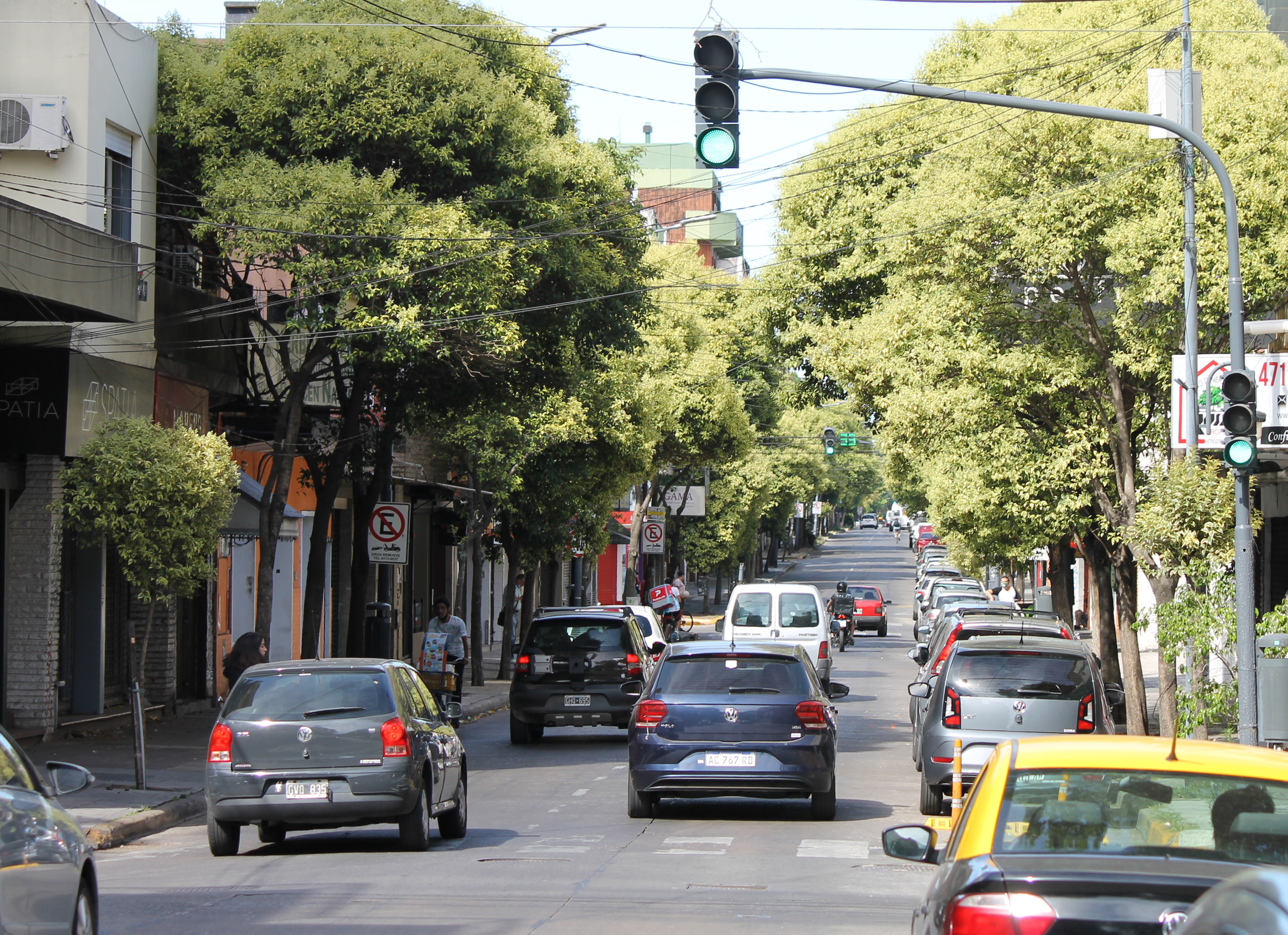
San Martín Avenue

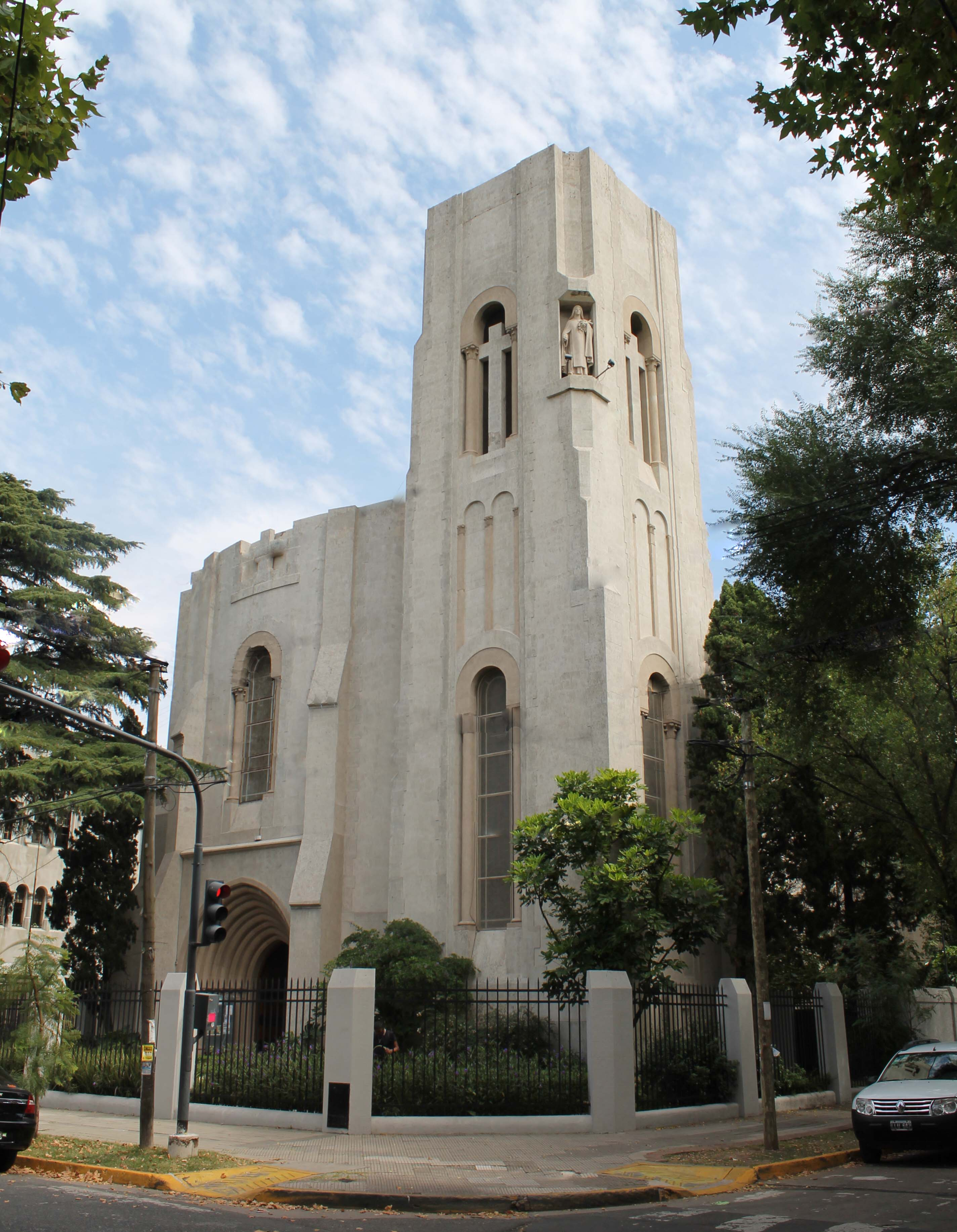
Parroquia Santa Teresita del Niño Jesús

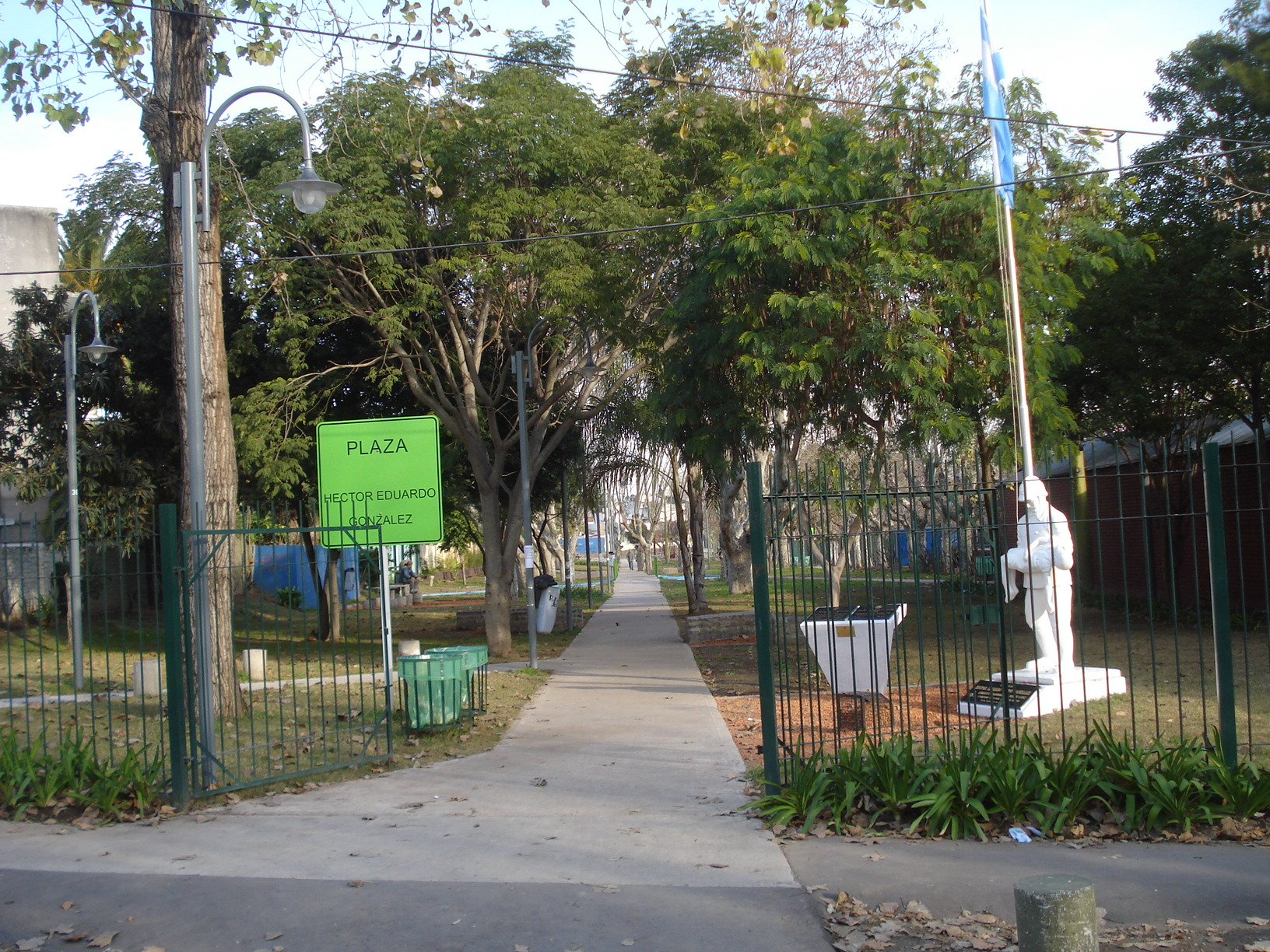
Plaza Héctor González

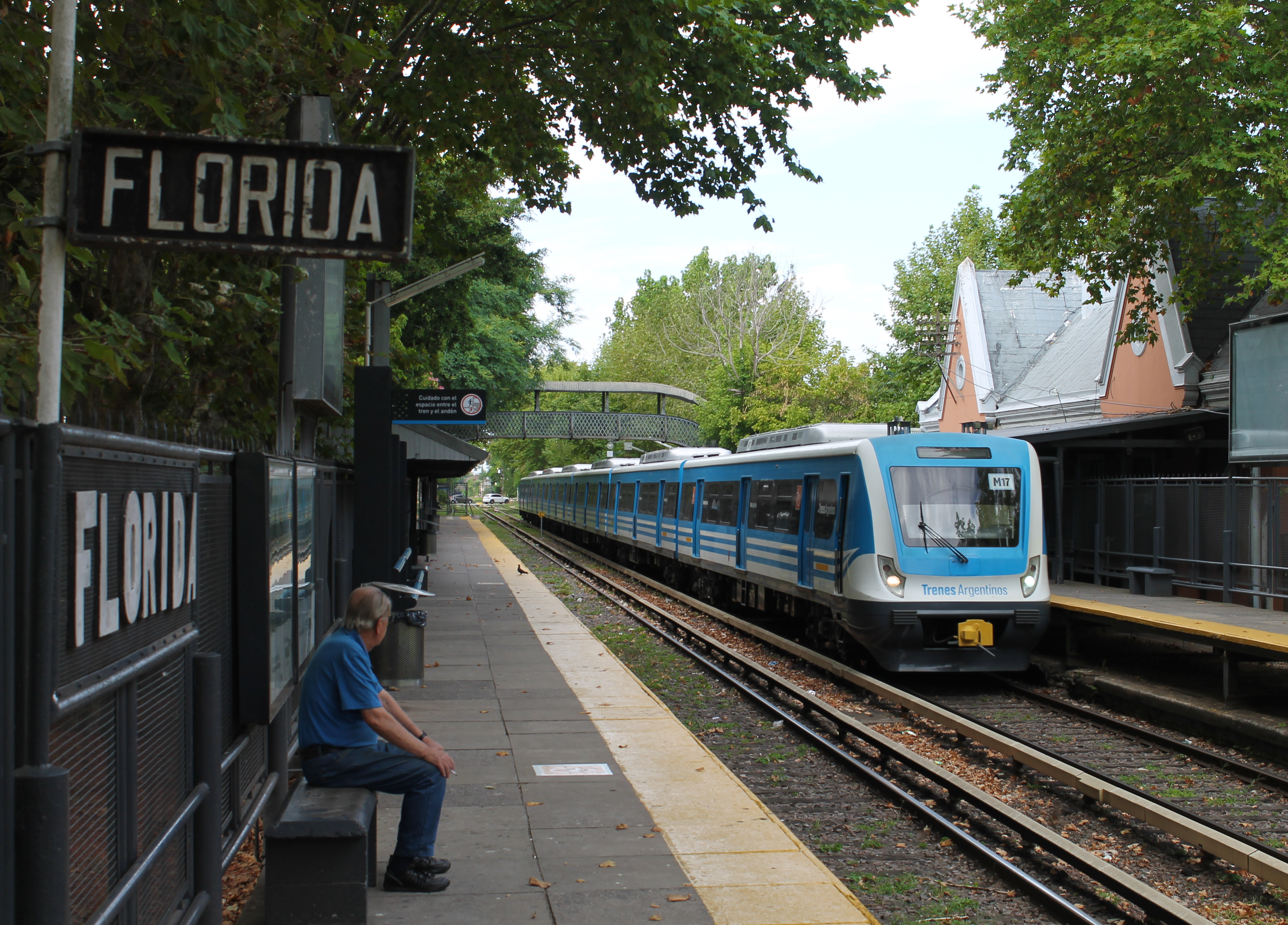
Florida train station

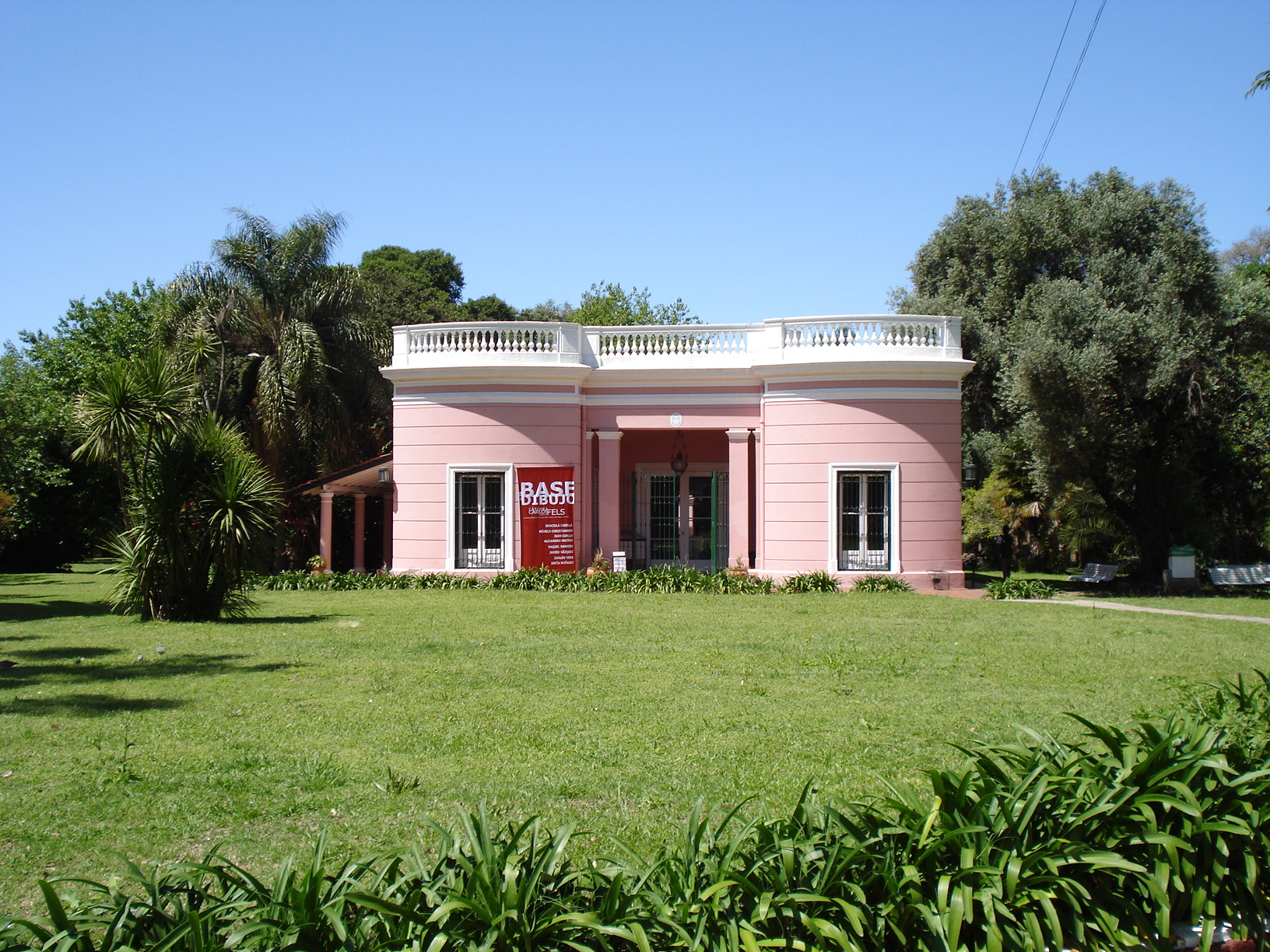
Quinta Trabucco
