= Vicente López, Buenos Aires =

Vicente López
- District
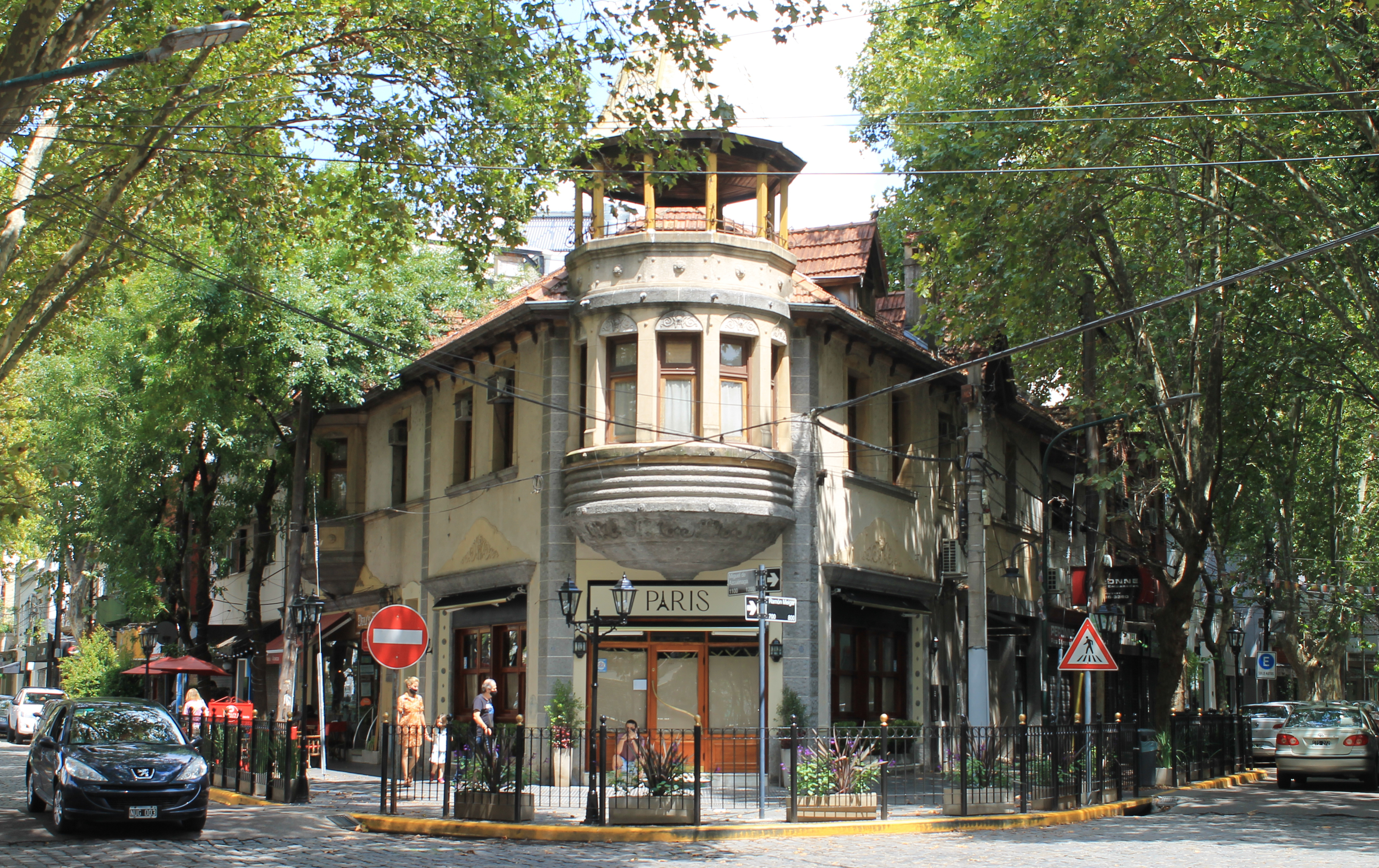
- Azcuénaga Street, Vicente López.

- Location in Greater Buenos Aires
- Coordinates: 34°32′S 58°28.5′W
- Country: Argentina
- Province: Buenos Aires
- Partido: Vicente López
- Founded: 1905
- Elevation: 4 m (13 ft)

Population (2010 census [INDEC])
  - Total: 24,078
- CPA Base: B 1602
- Area code: +54 11

Vicente López is a neighborhood in Vicente López Partido, Buenos Aires Province, Argentina. It is a suburb in the Buenos Aires metropolitan area.

It currently has about 24,078 inhabitants. It is bounded to the north by Olivos, to the west by Florida, to the south by the city of Buenos Aires, and to the east by the Río de la Plata.

== Notable people ==
- Marcela Kloosterboer (born 1983), actress
- Andy Muschietti (born 1973), film director and screenwriter
