= La Lucila =

- District
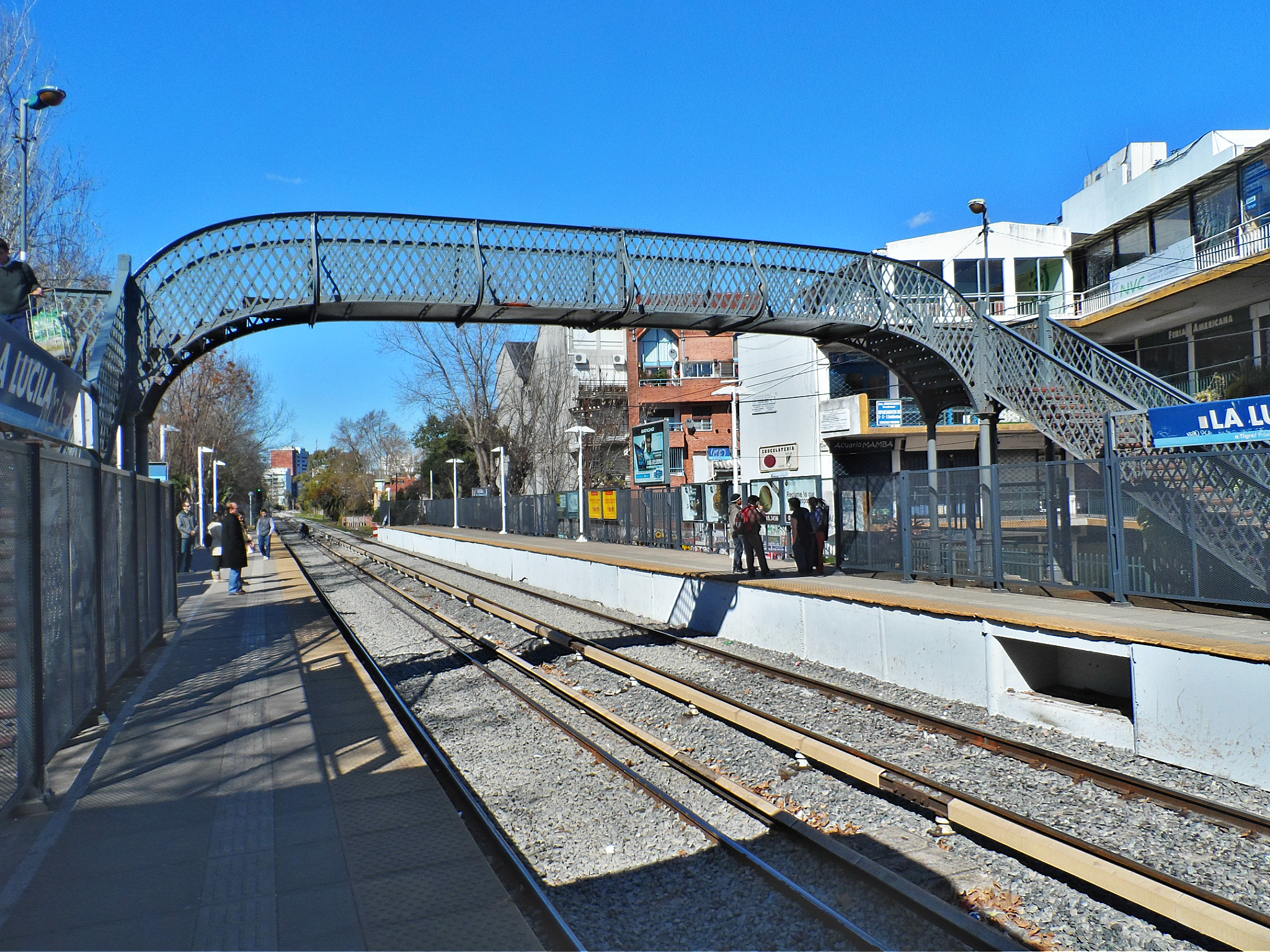
- La Lucila train station.

- Location in Greater Buenos Aires
- Coordinates: 34°29′55″S 58°29′19″W
- Country: Argentina
- Province: Buenos Aires
- Partido: Vicente López
- Founded: 1856
- Elevation: 18 m (59 ft)

Population (2001 census [INDEC])
  - Total: 15,844
- CPA Base: B 1636
- Area code: +54 11

La Lucila is a neighborhood in Vicente López Partido, Buenos Aires Province, Argentina. The community is a suburb in the Buenos Aires metropolitan area.

It has a light railway station (La Lucila) on the Retiro-Tigre line - north on the line is Martínez and south is Olivos. It is also close to the Tren de la Costa.

The name comes from a large mansion that was named for the owner's wife. He was teniente coronel Alfredo F. de Urquiza and his wife was named Lucila Marcelina Anchorena de Urquiza.

== Location ==
La Lucila borders the locality of Martínez to the north (Paraná Street, which is also the boundary of the partido), and the neighborhood of Olivos to the west (Avenida Maipú) and to the south (Roma Street), and the Río de la Plata to the east.

La Lucila is located 12 km north of the City of Buenos Aires. It covers an area of 1.6 km² (160 hectares). In 2001, it had a population of 12,222 inhabitants (INDEC 2001); this figure made it the 8th neighborhood of the partido, with 4.5% of its population. In 1991, 13,528 people were registered, indicating a population decrease of almost 10%.

== History ==
During the first English invasion, a military battery was set up at Punta de los Olivos to protect the coast, in what is now La Lucila.

At the beginning of the 20th century, large subdivisions and land auctions began. Between Avenida Libertador and the Mitre Railroad tracks, the first residences of aristocratic Buenos Aires families were built, who chose La Lucila as a place to rest outside of Buenos Aires.

One of the first residences was the luxurious mansion called "La Lucila," owned by Lieutenant Colonel Alfredo F. de Urquiza. Construction began in 1912 and it was inaugurated in 1915. He named it La Lucila in honor of his wife, Lucila Marcelina Anchorena de Urquiza, who died two years later.

The residence became very famous, and soon the neighbors began to call the area La Lucila.

In the 1920s, subdivisions multiplied and new families settled in the area. In 1931, the first bus line was inaugurated, and two years later, on November 10, 1933, the station was built on land donated by Alfredo F. de Urquiza.

After the economic crisis of the 1930s, the maintenance costs of the La Lucila residence became excessive, and the heirs could not reach an agreement to maintain it. Therefore, in 1939, they decided to demolish it; finally, in 1943, they auctioned off its land. Only the lookout survived, being the oldest corner of the neighborhood.

On March 1, 1934, a group of neighbors founded the La Lucila Improvement Society, and on February 28, 1943, they settled at Tucumán 3339, where it currently operates.

It was not until 1980 that the ordinance granting it neighborhood status was approved.

In 1981, the cable operator Cablevisión was founded.

On December 29, 2000, the Ecological Reserve was inaugurated, located at Avenida Paraná and the Río de la Plata (at the height of Avenida del Libertador at 4000). It covers 3.5 hectares and contains native flora and various animal species.

== Education ==
Asociación Escuelas Lincoln, an American international school, is in La Lucila.
