= Maxine Swann =

American fiction author (born 1969)

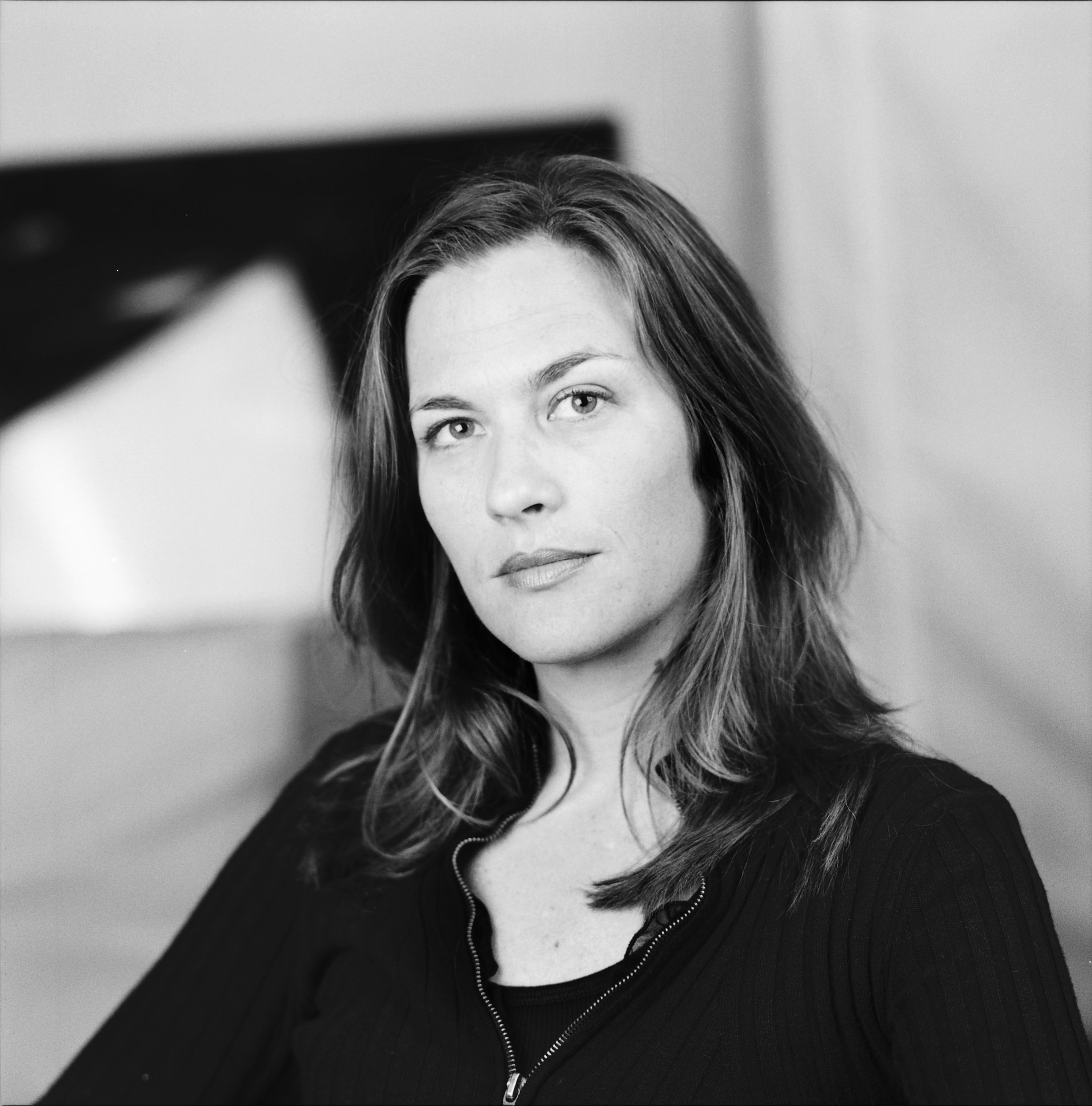
- Maxine Swann
- Born: February 11, 1969 (age 57)
- Education: Columbia College, New York City
- Known for: Fiction
- Notable work: "Flower Children" (short story)
- Awards: Cohen, O. Henry, Pushcart

Maxine Swann (born February 11, 1969) is an American fiction author.

== Life ==
Swann grew up on a farm in southern Pennsylvania, before attending Phillips Academy and then Columbia College, where she studied Comparative Literature (French and German) and creative writing with Mary Gordon, graduating in 1994.

She pursued her graduate studies at the Sorbonne, Université de Paris VII, earning her master's degree in 1997 with a thesis on the style of Marcel Proust. She now lives in Buenos Aires, Argentina.

Insights into her 2001 move to Argentina, divorce and life as an ex-pat writer were the subject of a "At Home Abroad" column of The New York Times on June 19, 2008.

== Work ==
Swann's work first appeared in Ploughshares, in an issue guest-edited by Mary Gordon, and she won a Cohen Award for that short story, "Flower Children", in 1997. The same story won her an O. Henry Award, the Pushcart Prize and selection by The Best American Short Stories.

At the time, Ploughshares quoted her: "All stories, I think, are in the end a very dense mixture of memory and imagination, with the doses varying each time. 'Flower Children,' I see now, was a story I'd been trying to write since I'd begun writing. It is, in a sense, a condensation of nearly all the stories, pages, and even poems that I wrote in grade school, high school, and then college. In her writing class at Columbia, Mary Gordon, taking my efforts seriously, pressed me further towards it, also introducing me to the Austrian writer Ingeborg Bachmann, whose work eventually led me to find the form in which to say what I wanted to say."

Her first novel, Serious Girls, was published by Picador in 2003 and focused on the coming of age of two boarding school girls, Maya and Roe. Swann's second novel, Flower Children, appeared in May 2007, published by Riverhead Books and won the Harold D. Vursell Memorial Award from The Academy of Arts and Letters honoring "recent writing in book form that merits recognition for the quality of its prose style." Her third book, The Foreigners [August 2011, Riverhead], which traces the lives of four foreigners living in Buenos Aires, was called "a fearless novel," by Joseph O'Neill (author of "Netherland"), "beautifully written, sensual, seductive," by Kirkus Review and "atmospheric, evocative literary fiction that ruminates on what it means and how it feels to be foreign" by Booklist.

Swann's journalism has appeared in The New York Times, The Wall Street Journal, The Huffington Post and the Buenos Aires Herald. Her March 2013 story for The New York Times Magazine, "The Professor, the Bikini Model and the Suitcase Full of Trouble" was optioned for a feature film by Fox Searchlight.

She is a founding editor of the bilingual literary magazine The Buenos Aires Review.

Swann has taught creative writing at Barnard College and also works as a private writing coach.

=== Flower Children ===
Flower Children is a series of linked short stories written by Swann over the course of a decade, published ten years before in Ploughshares. The stories are written from different points of view; the first chapter follows a collective, fused third person, i.e. the "they" of the children growing up; others are told in the first person by Maeve, whom, given the parallels between Swann's fiction and her life, the reader may assume to be her proxy.

The book was praised by Michiko Kakutani in "The New York Times" as "a gem of a novel, a novel that showcases [Swann's] eye for detail, her psychological acuity, her ability to conjure up a particular place and time," and summarized in the "Newly Released" column of The New York Times, where Amy Virshup wrote, "In this slim volume she returns to the story, about four young children being raised by their hippie parents on a farm in rural Pennsylvania (which tracks closely Ms. Swann's own childhood). The eight chapters take the children from the paradise of their early childhood ... to young adulthood when they return to the farm as visitors."

The tone of the short stories varies, interfering, as one reviewer has noted, with the coherence of the work.
