= Juan Carlos Pellegrini =

- Born: c. 1927
- Died: September 14, 2014 (aged 86–87); Buenos Aires
- Known for: President of Aerolíneas Argentinas (1983–1984); President of Baluma S.A. (?–2001)
- Military career
- Allegiance: Argentina
- Branch: Argentine Air Force
- Rank: Officer

Juan Carlos Pellegrini (c. 1927–2014) was a lawyer, officer of the Argentine Air Force, and businessman.

From 1973, he held several important positions at Aerolíneas Argentinas and was appointed president in 1982. During his tenure, the company dramatically expanded its commercial flights and created new international routes, becoming one of South America's most important airlines. His tenure was also marked by covert operations in support of Argentine troops during the Falklands War, including arms smuggling. He resigned from his post in 1983 due to disagreements with the military junta's economic interventions.

He is also known for serving as the president of the board of Baluma S.A., which was responsible for building the Conrad Punta del Este Resort & Casino in 1992. He left the presidency in 2001 following a strong capitalization carried out by Caesars.

== Career at Aerolíneas Argentinas ==
Pellegrini was a lawyer and also served as an officer in the Argentine Air Force.

From 1973, Pellegrini held several senior positions at Aerolíneas Argentinas. In 1972, he became the general manager under the presidency of César Guasco. In January 1975, Guasco resigned due to organizational changes made by the Argentine government, and Pellegrini resigned as well. In 1979, Pellegrini became the vice president under Pablo Apella. Apella maintained good relations with the government but left the company in 1982. Pellegrini then became the new president.

During his terms, the airline purchased its first jumbo jets and implemented new commercial flights. The number of passengers flying Aerolíneas Argentinas grew quickly, and Pellegrini established the "Pilot Training Centre", featuring the first flight simulators in Argentina. He also implemented the "Maintenance Service of Planes and Others" and the first computerized ticketing system in Argentina. Furthermore, he introduced night flights to southern Argentina at half-price with no in-flight service.

Pellegrini secured several agreements with other airline companies from the Global South, including Latin American and African nations. These deals enabled international travel to Asian countries, including New Zealand, Australia, and Japan. On 7 June 1980, Aerolíneas Argentinas made the first commercial flight between South America and Oceania.

He also collaborated with the International Air Transport Association and served on its executive committee. In 1983, he was a candidate for the role of Director of the committee but was not selected.

In April 1982, during the Falklands War, Aerolíneas Argentinas was ordered by the government to help circumvent the blockade imposed by the United Kingdom and NATO. Pellegrini opened a flight route to the Falkland Islands and began an operation to transport goods and soldiers known as the "Cirrus Plan". The company transported about 6,500 soldiers and 270 tons of cargo in 89 flights. From 27 May onwards, the company made seven clandestine flights to transport ammunition for the Argentine troops. Thirty-seven tons of weapons were purchased and transported from Tel Aviv and Tripoli; one flight to Cape Town failed. These operations were nicknamed "Secret Flights". Lima was also used as a transshipment point to transport goods bought from Israel.

Despite the huge investment in the company during the beginning of the military dictatorship, in 1983 the government's finances were precarious, and it sought help from American banks and other investors to maintain Aerolíneas Argentinas' operations. The banks assisted but imposed severe conditions, stipulating that payment delays would be covered by assets from other Argentine state companies. The military junta imposed dividends without the participation of the company itself, generating protests from employees. The Commander of the Air Force requested Pellegrini's resignation, ending his career at Aerolíneas Argentinas.

== Career at Conrad Punta del Este ==
Pellegrini first settled in Punta del Este, Uruguay, in the late 1970s, when he purchased a house named "La Bretonne" in the lighthouse area.

In the early 1990s, he served as the president of the board of Baluma S.A. He subsequently won an international public tender to build a five-star hotel with a casino in Punta del Este. In February 1992, his company founded the Conrad Punta del Este Resort & Casino, and Pellegrini worked as president until 30 August 2001, when the company underwent a strong capitalization carried out by Caesars.

== Sale of Aerolíneas Argentinas ==
In 2001, Aerolíneas Argentinas was suffering a financial crisis. A group of investors offered solutions to SEPI, the majority shareholder, hoping that the airline would sell 90% of its shares to the best proposal. One of the seven candidates was a consortium led by Pellegrini, who was considered a favorite to become the new owner. He intended to reformulate the company's structure, offering 20% of the shares to the stock market, 30% to office-holders, and 35% to investors. Among other changes, he announced an investment of US$600 million and deals with Singapore Airlines and Iberia.

Those who reportedly supported Pellegrini's campaign included various politicians and HSBC. He was the only candidate openly supported by the aviation trade unions. Nicolás Gallo stated that he had communicated Pérez Companc's interest in supporting Pellegrini, but the company denied any involvement with the government and filed a lawsuit.

In October, SEPI declined all Argentine offers and sold its shares and the shares of Austral Líneas Aéreas to another Spanish company, Air Comet-Marsans. After the sale, Pellegrini criticized the lack of action from the Fernando de la Rúa government.

== Death ==
Pellegrini died on 14 September 2014 in Buenos Aires.
