= Murder of Solange Grabenheimer =

2007 unsolved murder in Argentina

- Undated photo of Solange Grabenheimer
- Location: Florida, Buenos Aires, Argentina
- Date: 10 January 2007; 19 years ago
- Attack type: Murder by strangulation and stab wounds
- Victims: Solange Grabenheimer, aged 21
- Perpetrator: Unknown (case unsolved)
- Motive: Unknown
- Verdict: Acquitted (Lucila Frend)

On 10 January 2007, 21-year-old Solange Grabenheimer was found stabbed and strangled in the second floor of her apartment in Florida, Buenos Aires, Argentina. In a case that caught national attention, Grabenheimer's roommate and friend Lucila Frend was ultimately charged with her aggravated murder. Frend was tried in 2011 and acquitted. The crime remains unsolved.

== Discovery and investigation ==
On 10 January 2007 at around 23:00, police were called to an apartment in Calle Güemes in the Greater Buenos Aires area of Florida. There, they found the body of 21-year-old Solange Grabenheimer, who had been found by her friend Lucila Frend and Grabenheimer's boyfriend. Frend, who had left the apartment early in the morning, grew increasingly worried by the late night, when Grabenheimer did not show up for a birthday party and did not answer to her repeated phone calls.

When police arrived at the scene, they asked Frend to identify the body and to see if the apartment had been robbed. Frend assured police that nothing had been stolen, and told prosecutor Alejandro Guevara that she was "horrified" to see her friend dead by the side of her bed. Days later, Guevara summoned Frend for a reconstruction of the crime scene and interrogated her. During the reconstruction, Frend simulated strangling Grabenheimer with a computer wire, which was a detail of the crime only known to the investigators.

Guevara then argued that the two young women had a "conflicting relationship", Guevara charged Frend with Grabenheimer's aggravated murder and asked for her arrest. The arrest warrant was denied on the basis that Frend's constitutional rights had been violated during the reconstruction of the crime.

The time of the murder was disputed; some investigators believed that Grabenheimer had been killed between 1:00 and 7:00, which would have complicated Frend's situation, while others estimated that it occurred around 9:00.

Other items which police investigated were an open balcony door, from where somebody could have entered into the room, other people with whom Grabenheimer had had a confrontation or who were suspects for the investigators, and the hand used to kill Grabenheimer, with some saying that the killer was left-handed (used by the prosecution to accuse Frend) and others pointing to either a right-handed killer or uncertainty.

== Trial of Lucila Frend ==
Guevara, who placed Frend in the apartment at the time of the killing, charged her with Grabenheimer's murder. Frend pleaded not guilty to the charges and was ordered to undergo a psychiatric evaluation for court purposes in February 2008.

In November 2009, while awaiting trial, Frend travelled to Europe. Her lawyers stated that she had not fled the charges, and that the court had placed no restrictions on her movements. Marina Harvey, Frend's mother, argued that Frend was working in Europe to avoid the press and the involvement in the high-profile case with the media.

The trial date was set for 13 June 2011, and Frend returned from Europe to face the court. Guevara announced the charges against Frend as a "double aggravated homicide" and, along with the victim's family's lawyer, asked for a sentence of life imprisonment. Frend again denied the charges and confirmed her not guilty plea.

On 12 July 2011, Frend was acquitted of Grabenheimer's murder in a unanimous ruling by a three-judge panel, who cited a lack of evidence. After the ruling, Frend talked to the press and said that she would continue to pursue the investigation to solve the case. The prosecution appealed the verdict.

In December 2013, the Court of Cassation upheld her acquittal. The statute of limitations for the crime expired in January 2022, and it remains unsolved.
