= Air Cargo Inc. =

- Industry: Transportation
- Founded: 1941; 85 years ago
- Headquarters: San Francisco, California, United States
- Products: Air freight Cargo airlines Courier express services Freight-forwarding services Logistics services
- Website: aircargocommunities.com

Aircargo Communities Inc., also known as Air Cargo Inc. or ACI, is a network of air freight cartage agents and trucking companies providing services to airlines and freight forwarders in North America. This network was established in 1941 during World War II by major US carriers including United, American, TWA, and Eastern to accommodate their ground transportation needs.

Air Cargo Inc. publishes the Air Freight Directory, also known as the "ACI Guide".
