= Fernando Bonsembiante =

Argentine hacker and writer (1966–2015)

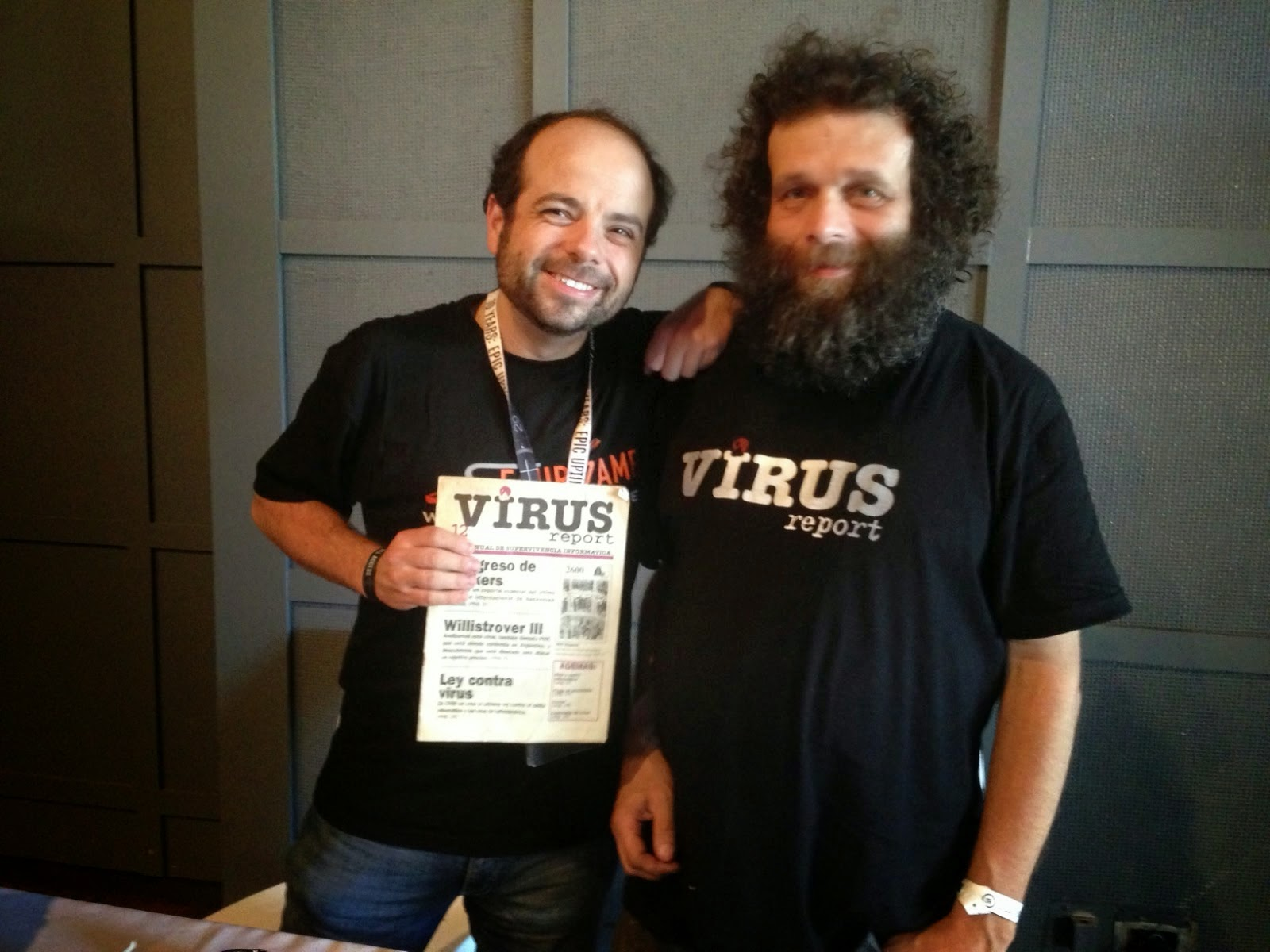
- Bonsembiante (right) posing in 2014 with his magazine, Virus Report
- Born: May 28, 1966; Buenos Aires
- Died: July 8, 2015 (aged 49); Buenos Aires
- Burial place: Morón cemetery
- Known for: Writing about hacking and sci-fi
- Notable work: Virus Report, Llaneros Solitarios: La Guerrilla Informática

Fernando Bonsembiante (1966–2015) was an Argentine hacker and writer, known for writing extensively about the underground hacking scene on the Hispanic world.

== Life ==
Bonsembiante was born in Buenos Aires, 28 May 1966.

During the 80s, Bonsembiante has organized underground rock music parties at his house on Castelar Centro. His parties were called "Dragón Verde", and inspired the creation of the homonymous rock band.

Bonsembiante was also a hacker, but he was better known for writing about it, and not for his technical skills. He has written extensively about the subject, and was the editor-in-chief of the Virus Report. The magazine was published between 1993 and 1995 and covered real underground stories about hackers.

Bonsembiante died in Buenos Aires on 8 July 2015 from a heart attack. He was buried on the 11th at the Morón cemetery.

== Work ==
Bonsembiante was known for writing about hacking for magazines, such as PC Users, Compumagazine, Virus Report and for the book Llaneros Solitarios: La Guerrilla Informática. He has also written for the periodical Página 12 and later for the Clarín.

He was also known for writing sci-fi. His firsts texts about fiction were published at the Feria del Libro Independiente Autogestiva, and later he has written for Axxon and Neuromante INC. He has also written sci-fi books, such as La Tardecita de los Dioses, Una Visita al Dios del Fuego, Historias del Movimiento Snárquico Organizado de Agitación Surrealista, Ajusten los Controles para el Corazón del Sol and Un Dios Con Rostro Inhumano.
