= Vicente López Partido =

Vicente López
- Partido
- Partido de Vicente López
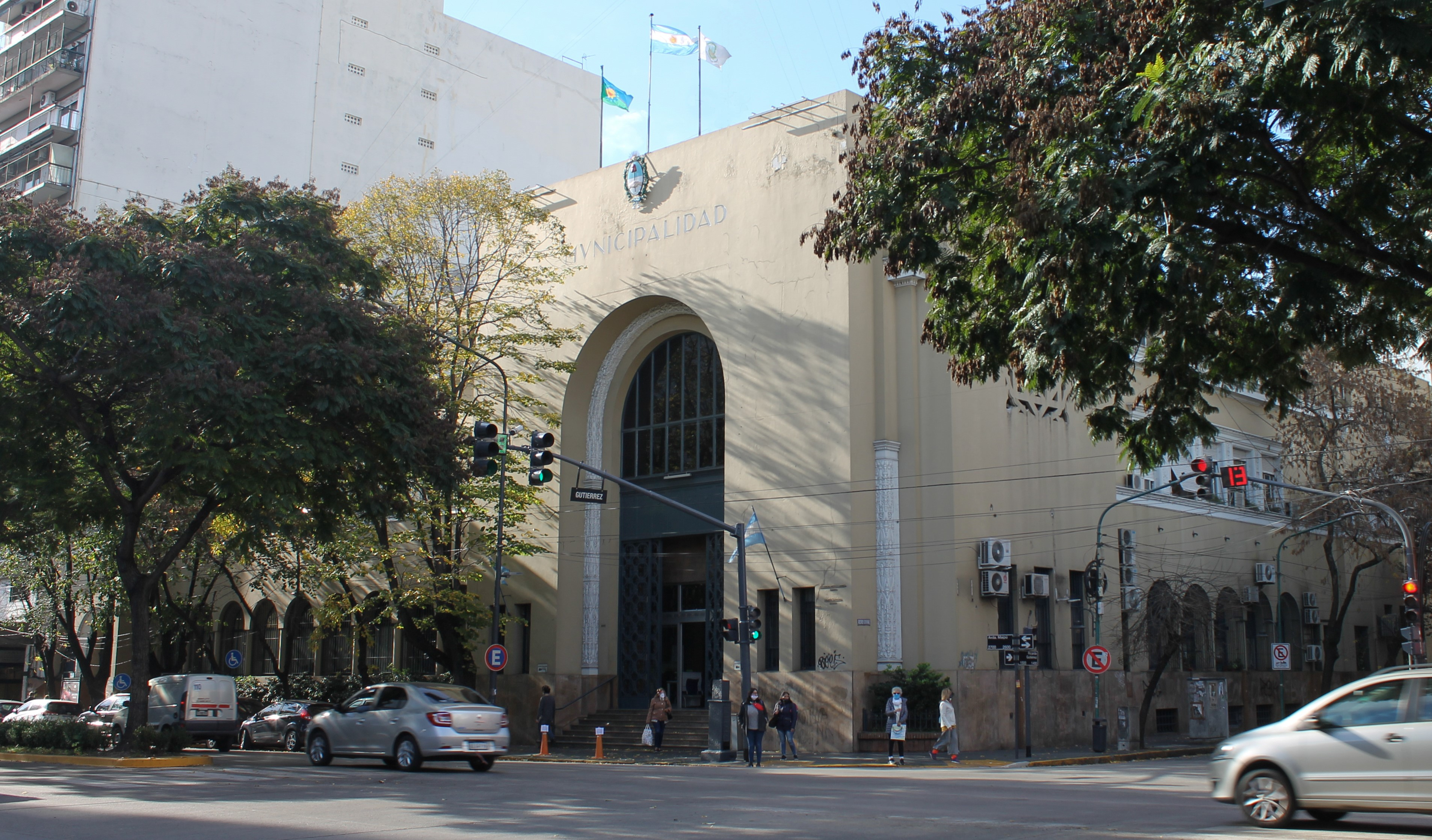
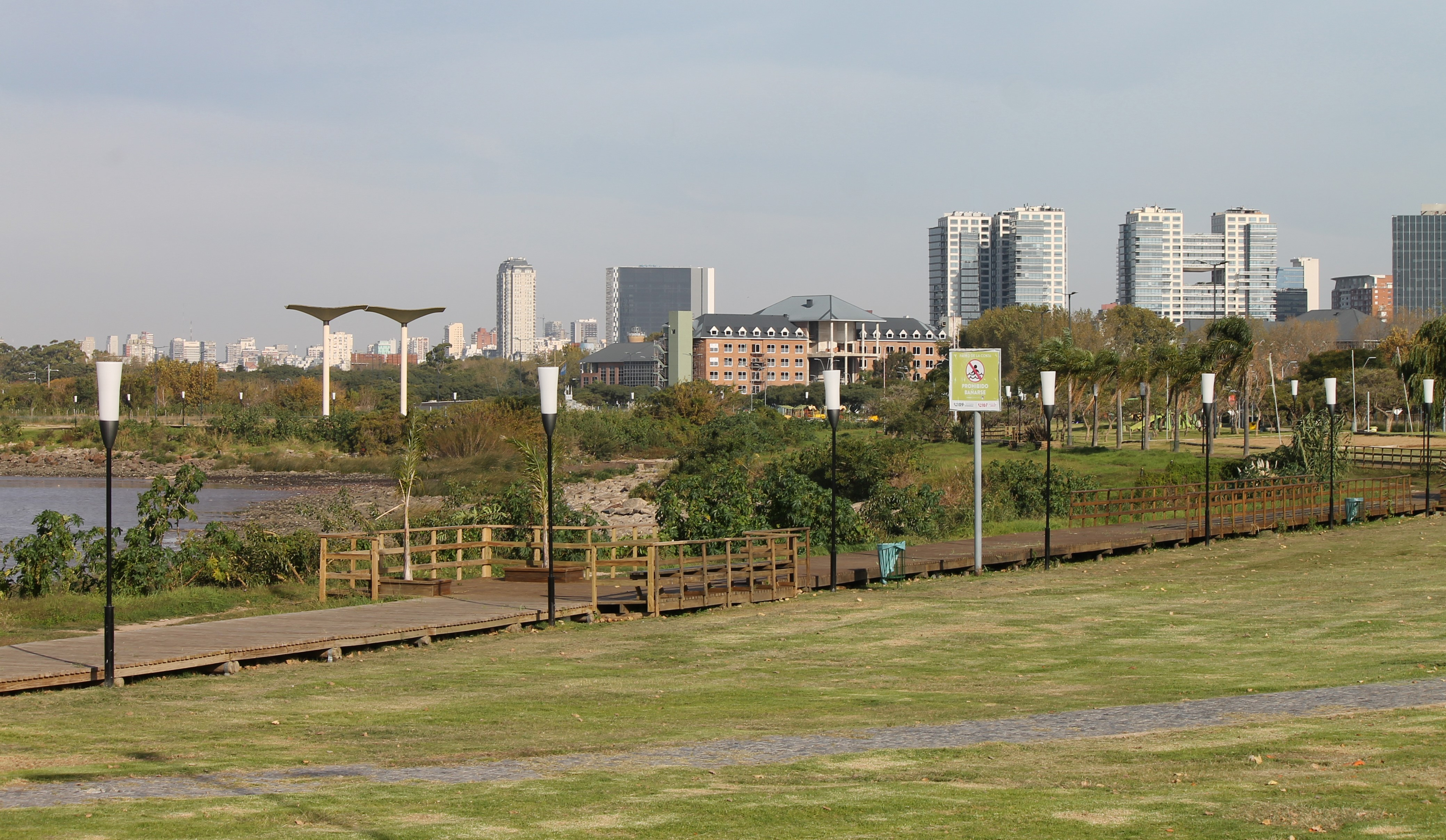
- From top to bottom: Vicente López city hall and Río de la Plata riverside.

- Flag Coat of arms

- location of Vicente López Partido in Greater Buenos Aires
- Coordinates: 34°31′S 58°29′W
- Country: Argentina
- Established: December 21, 1905
- Founder: provincial law 2959
- Seat: Olivos

Government
  - Intendant: Soledad Martínez (PRO)

Area
  - Total: 34 km^{2} (13 sq mi)

Population (2022)
  - Total: 282,281
  - Density: 8,300/km^{2} (22,000/sq mi)
- Demonym: vicentelopense
- Postal Code: B1602, B1603, B1605, B1606, B1636, B1637, B1638, B1652
- IFAM: BUE131
- Area Code: 011
- Patron saint: Jesús en el Huerto de los Olivos
- Website: www.vicentelopez.gov.ar

Vicente López is a partido in the Buenos Aires metropolitan area, Buenos Aires Province, Argentina. It is one of the country´s most affluent municipalities.

Vicente López is located 20 kilometers north of downtown Buenos Aires and 80 kilometers north of the city of La Plata, the provincial capital. The partido incorporates several smaller neighborhoods, including Olivos, Florida and La Lucila with a total estimated population of 269,420. Its 33 km² makes Vicente López the smallest partido in the Buenos Aires Province and the second smallest municipality in Argentina.

Vicente López is renowned for its expansive residential neighborhoods, the Argentine presidential residence, named Quinta de Olivos, and its coastal park along the Río de la Plata. In October 2023, Vicente López was named a UNESCO City of Film and joined the UNESCO Creative Cities Network.

== Toponymy ==
The partido's name honors Vicente López y Planes, an Argentine writer and politician, author of the lyrics of the Argentine National Anthem, governor of Buenos Aires province (after the fall of Juan Manuel de Rosas) and then President of Argentina succeeding Bernardino Rivadavia.

López y Planes also composed El Triunfo Argentino, an ode to the resistance during the English invasion of Buenos Aires. At the beginning it was going to be called "Olivos", currently the name of the most important district of Vicente López.

== Location ==
The partido is bordered by the city of Buenos Aires to the South, General San Martín Partido to the West, San Isidro Partido at the North and Río de la Plata to the East.

== Districts ==
Districts of Vicente López

- Carapachay
- Florida
- Florida Oeste
- La Lucila
- Munro
- Olivos
- Vicente López
- Villa Adelina
- Villa Martelli

== Demography ==
Vicente López is the 8th most populated partido of Greater Buenos Aires. Most of the inhabitants are descendants of Italian and Spanish immigrants. There are also descendants of German, Polish, Ukrainian, Armenian and Croatian amongst other nationalities.

The partido has 280,929 inhabitants according to the 2010 Census.

== Gallery ==
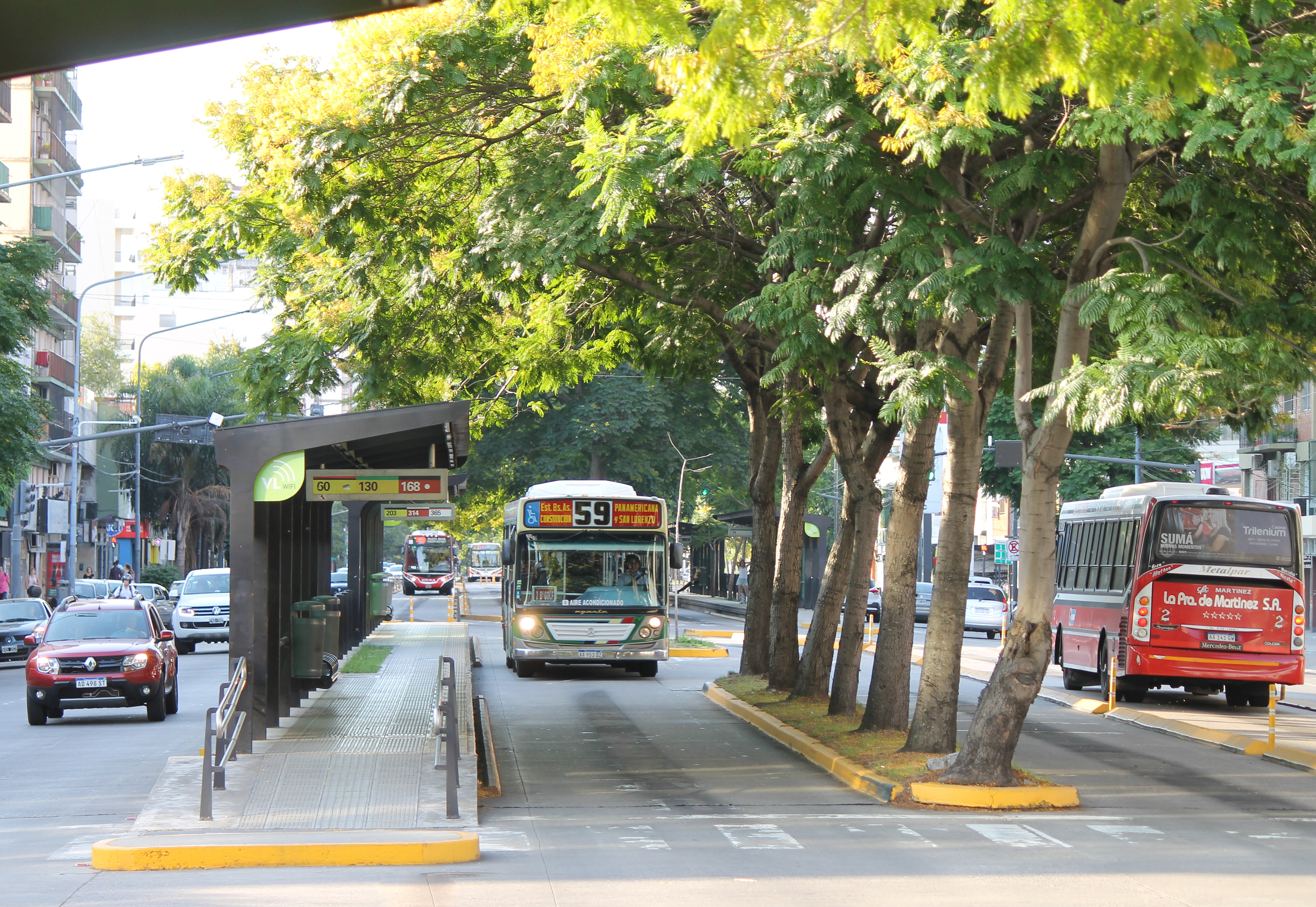
Maipú Avenue.

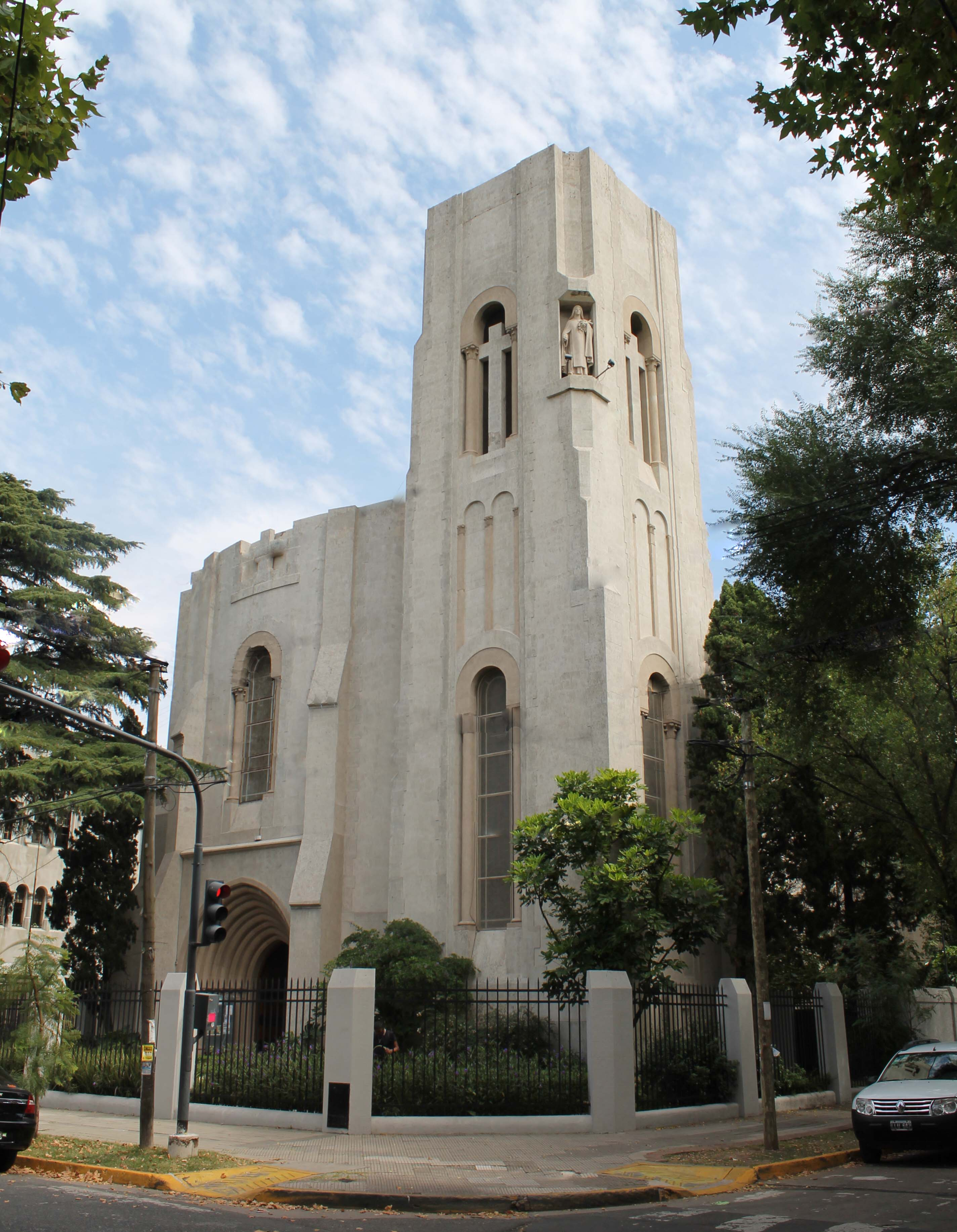
Santa Teresita catholic church in Florida.

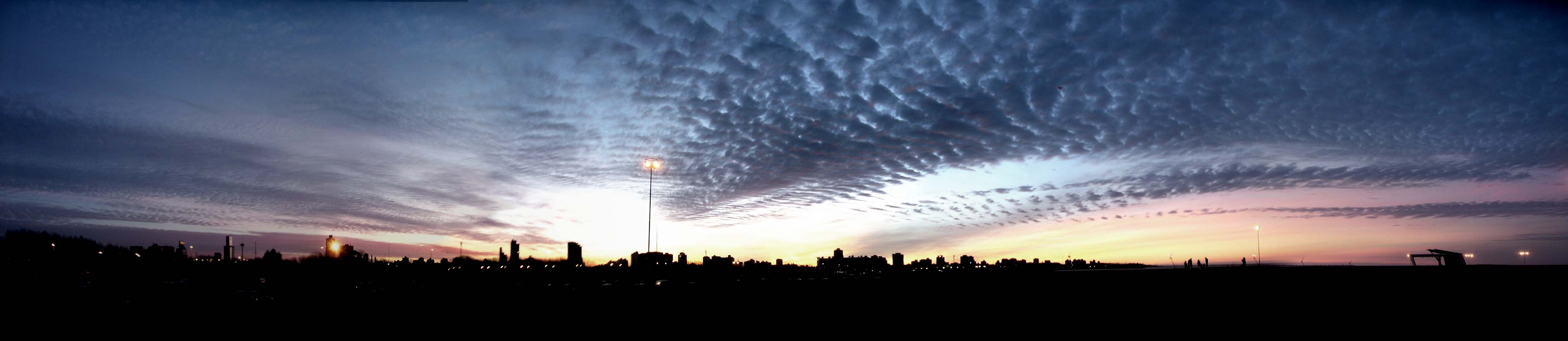
View of the area from the Río de la Plata.
