= List of bridges in Argentina =

This is a list of bridges and viaducts in Argentina, including those for pedestrians and vehicular traffic.

== Historical and architectural interest bridges ==
Photo		Name	Distinction	Length	Type	Carries Crosses	Opened	Location	Province	Ref.
	1	Old Bridge of San Antonio de Areco	National Historic Monument	18 m (59 ft)	Masonry; 1 segmental arch	Former road bridge Areco River	1857	San Antonio de Areco; 34°14′26.3″S 59°28′39.6″W	Buenos Aires Province	
	2	Puente Transbordador	National Historic Monument	65 m (213 ft)	Truss; Steel; Transporter bridge	Matanza River	1914	Buenos Aires; 34°38′18.8″S 58°21′22.3″W	Buenos Aires	
	3	Sáenz Peña President Bridge dismantled in 1965			Truss; Steel; Transporter bridge	Matanza River	1914	Buenos Aires	Buenos Aires	
	4	Urquiza President Bridge dismantled in 1965			Truss; Steel; Transporter bridge	Matanza River	1915	Buenos Aires	Buenos Aires	
	5	La Polvorilla Viaduct	Train to the Clouds; Located 4,200 metres (13,800 ft) above sea level Height : 63 m (207 ft)	224 m (735 ft)	Trestle bridge Steel	General Manuel Belgrano Railway	1932	San Antonio de los Cobres; 24°12′09.8″S 66°24′51.8″W	Salta Province	
	6	Puente Valentín Alsina	Sites of Cultural Interest	173 m (568 ft)	Truss; Steel; Bascule bridge	Road bridge Avenida Sáenz; Matanza River	1938	Buenos Aires –Valentín Alsina; 34°39′34.6″S 58°24′59.8″W	Buenos Aires	
	7	Puente Nicolás Avellaneda		1,633 m (5,358 ft)	Truss; Steel; Vertical-lift bridge	Road bridge Matanza River	1940	Buenos Aires; 34°38′17.0″S 58°21′20.4″W	Buenos Aires	
	8	Paso de los Libres–Uruguaiana International Bridge	First major bridge between Argentina and Brazil	1,419 m (4,656 ft)	Beam bridge Prestressed concrete	Road bridge National Route 117; Railway bridge Uruguay River	1945	Paso de los Libres–Uruguaiana; 29°44′35.4″S 57°05′34.9″W	Corrientes Province	
	9	Arroyo Cangrejillo Pipeline Bridge	Span : 338 m (1,109 ft); Height : 90 m (300 ft)	338 m (1,109 ft)	Catenary bridge	Footbridge; Pipeline bridge	1998	Aconquija; 27°24′56.2″S 65°56′35.8″W	Catamarca Province	
	10	Puente de la Mujer	Designed by Santiago Calatrava; Span : 100 m (330 ft)	160 m (520 ft)	Cable-stayed; Cantilever spar, steel deck, 1 inclined steel pylon Swing bridge	Footbridge; Dock 3	2001	Buenos Aires; 34°36′28.8″S 58°21′54.5″W	Buenos Aires	

== Major road and railway bridges ==
This table presents the structures with spans greater than 100 metres (330 ft) (non-exhaustive list).

	Name	Span	Length	Type	Carries Crosses	Opened	Location	Province	Ref.
1	Zárate–Brazo Largo Bridge; General Bartolomé Mitre Bridge	330 m (1,080 ft)	6,222 m (20,413 ft)	Cable-stayed; Steel box girder deck, concrete pylons 110+330+110	National Route 12; General Urquiza Railway; Paraná River (Paraná Guazú)	1978	Brazo Largo; 33°54′36.7″S 58°53′06.5″W	Entre Ríos Province	(Note: The approach viaducts of the road and the railway are distinct, the road part measures 4,016 m (13,176 ft) while the railway part measures 6,222 m (20,413 ft).)
2	Zárate–Brazo Largo Bridge; Justo José de Urquiza Bridge	330 m (1,080 ft)	4,571 m (14,997 ft)	Cable-stayed; Steel box girder deck, concrete pylons 110+330+110	National Route 12; General Urquiza Railway; Paraná River (Paraná de las Palmas)	1978	Zárate; 34°06′12.2″S 59°00′09.8″W	Buenos Aires Province	
3	San Roque González de Santa Cruz Bridge	330 m (1,080 ft)	2,550 m (8,370 ft)	Cable-stayed; Concrete box girder deck, concrete pylons 115+330+115	Road bridge Posadas-Encarnación International Train; Paraná River	1990	Posadas–Encarnación; 27°22′09.3″S 55°51′43.1″W	Misiones Province; Paraguay	
4	Rosario-Victoria Bridge	330 m (1,080 ft)	4,098 m (13,445 ft)	Cable-stayed; Composite steel/concrete deck, concrete pylons 120+330+120	National Route 174; Paraná River	2002	Rosario; 32°52′12.8″S 60°41′08.3″W	Santa Fe Province	
5	General Belgrano Bridge	245 m (804 ft)	2,800 m (9,200 ft)	Cable-stayed; Concrete girder deck, concrete pylons 163+245+163	National Route 16; Paraná River	1973	Corrientes–Resistencia; 27°28′12.9″S 58°51′35.4″W	Corrientes Province; Chaco Province	
6	Libertador General San Martín Bridge	220 m (720 ft)	3,408 m (11,181 ft)	Box girder Prestressed concrete 145+220+145	National Route 136; Uruguay River	1976	Gualeguaychú–Fray Bentos; 33°06′01.8″S 58°14′54.3″W	Entre Ríos Province; Uruguay	
7	Tancredo Neves Bridge	220 m (720 ft)	480 m (1,570 ft)	Box girder Prestressed concrete 130+220+130	National Route 12; Iguazu River	1985	Puerto Iguazú–Foz do Iguaçu; 25°35′19.0″S 54°33′41.5″W	Misiones Province; Brazil	
8	Hipólito Yrigoyen Bridge	150 m (490 ft)	270 m (890 ft)	Suspension; Steel girder deck, steel pylons 60+150+60	Road bridge Avenida Loberia; Quequén Grande River	1929	Necochea–Quequén; 38°33′07.8″S 58°43′32.4″W	Buenos Aires Province	
9	Santa Fe Suspension Bridge	148 m (486 ft)	295 m (968 ft)	Suspension; Steel deck and pylons Gisclard cable bridge 74+148+74	Road bridge Paraná River (Laguna Setúbal)	1928	Santa Fe; 31°38′24.3″S 60°40′52.4″W	Santa Fe Province	
10	General Artigas Bridge	140 m (460 ft)	2,350 m (7,710 ft)	Box girder Prestressed concrete 97+140+97	National Route 135; Uruguay River	1975	Colón–Paysandú; 32°15′53.1″S 58°06′00.9″W	Entre Ríos Province; Uruguay	
11	Governor José Manuel de la Sota Bridge	140 m (460 ft)	326 m (1,070 ft)	Arch; Concrete deck arch	Córdoba-Carlos Paz Highway; San Roque Lake	2019	Villa Carlos Paz; 31°22′26.7″S 64°26′29.2″W	Córdoba Province	
12	Governor Oroño Bridge	130 m (430 ft)	460 m (1,510 ft)	Box girder Prestressed concrete Twin bridges 84+130+84	National Route 168; Paraná River (Laguna Setúbal)	1970	Santa Fe; 31°38′26.8″S 60°40′53.8″W	Santa Fe Province	
13	Mugnaini Mayor Bicentennial Bridge	110 m (360 ft)	313 m (1,027 ft)	Cable-stayed; Concrete deck, steel pylons	Road bridge Cuarto River	2010	Río Cuarto; 33°06′12.5″S 64°21′10.1″W	Córdoba Province	

== See also ==
- Transport in Argentina
- List of highways in Argentina
- Rail transport in Argentina
- Geography of Argentina
- List of rivers of Argentina

== Notes and references ==
- Notes
- Nicolas Janberg. "International Database for Civil and Structural Engineering". Structurae.com.
- Others references
