= Puente Colgante =

Puente Colgante literally means "hanging bridge", which is the term used for suspension bridges in Spanish.

Puente Colgante may refer to:

- Vizcaya Bridge, a bridge commonly called Puente Colgante, which spans the Nervion River in the Biscay province of Spain.
- Puente Colgante (Manila), a suspension bridge that used span the Pasig River in Manila, Philippines.
- Puente Colgante de Santa Fe, Argentina.
