= La Boca =

Barrio in Buenos Aires, Argentina

Coordinates: 34°38′08″S 58°21′53″W

- Neighborhood
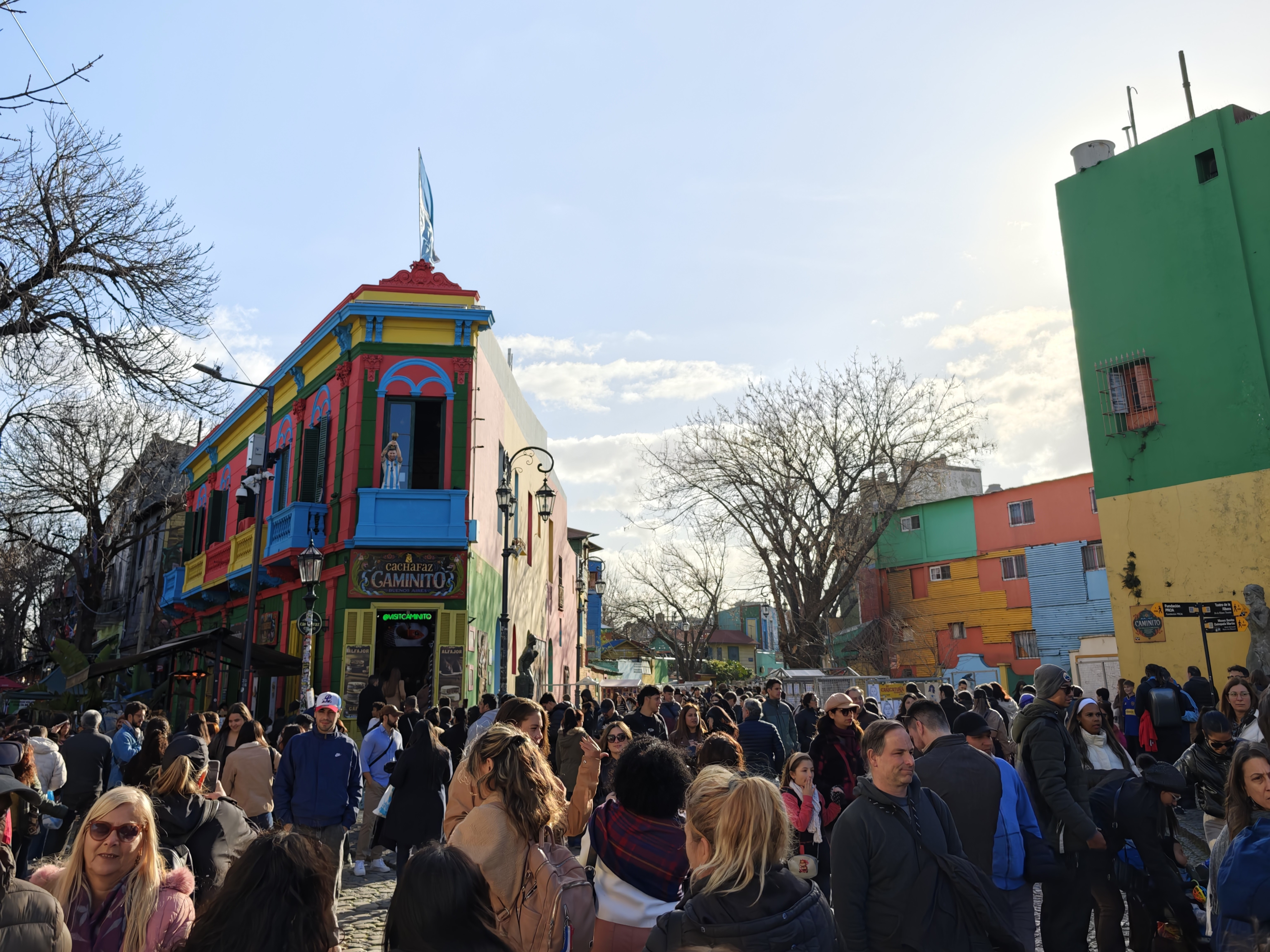
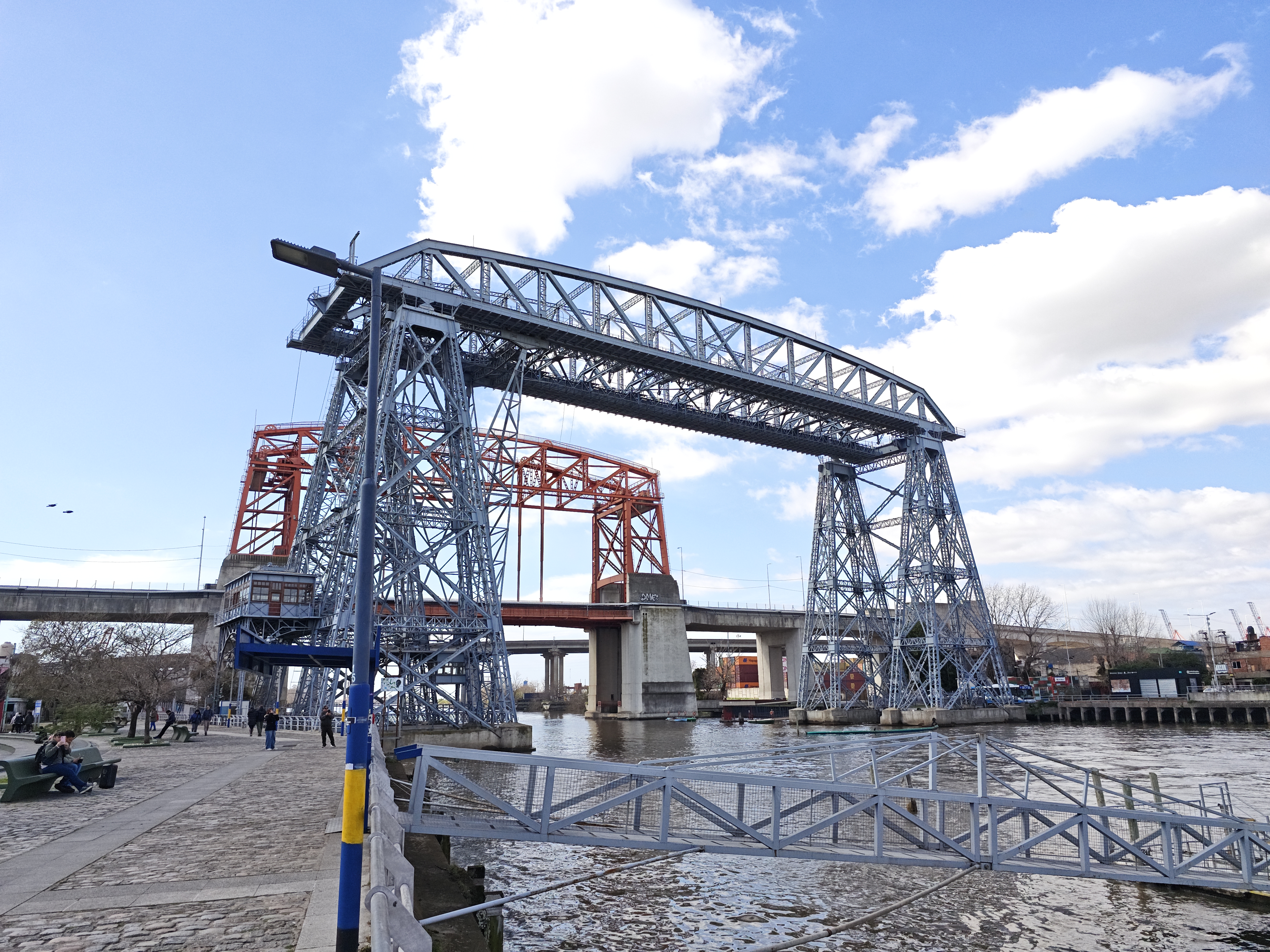
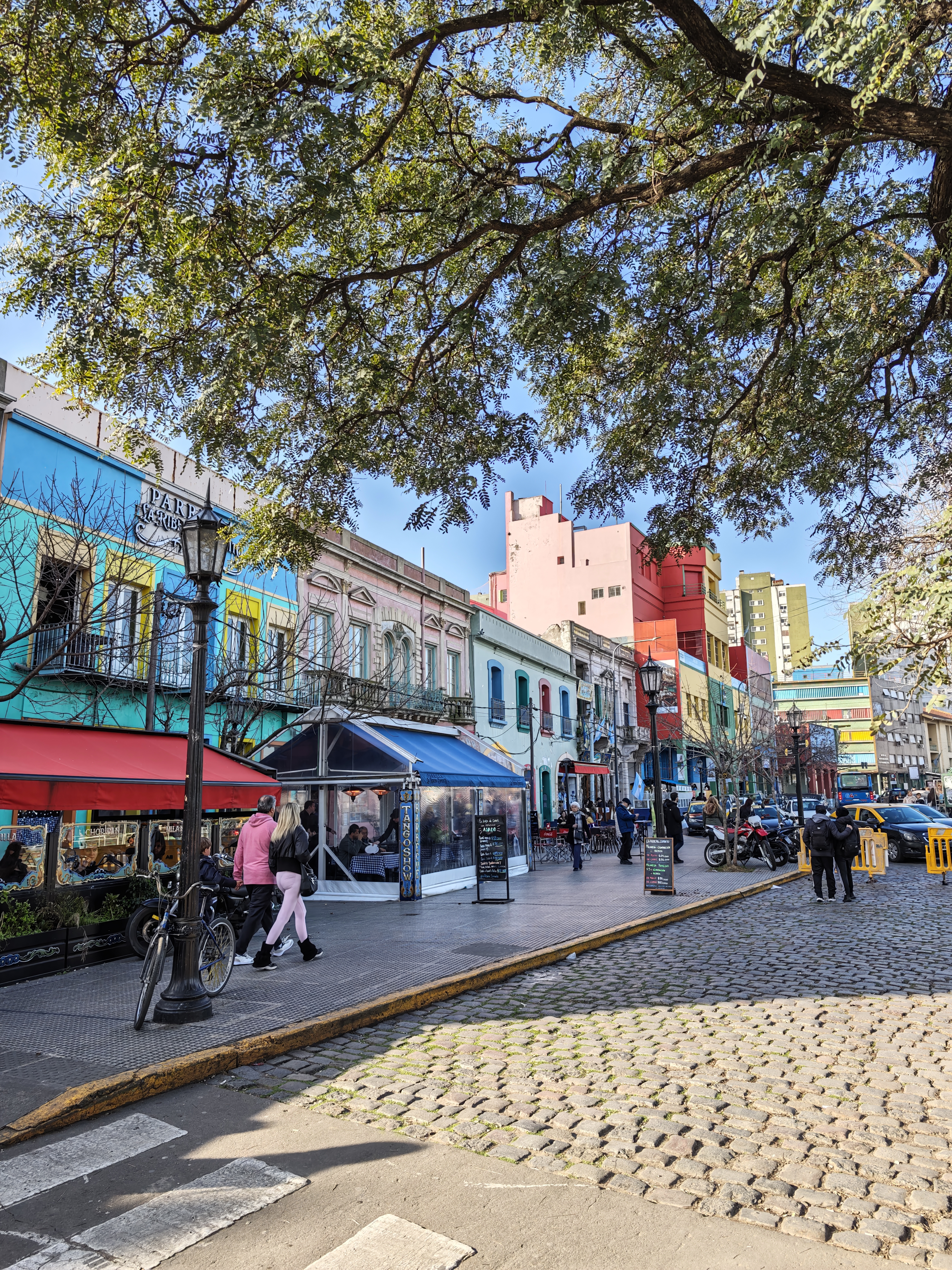
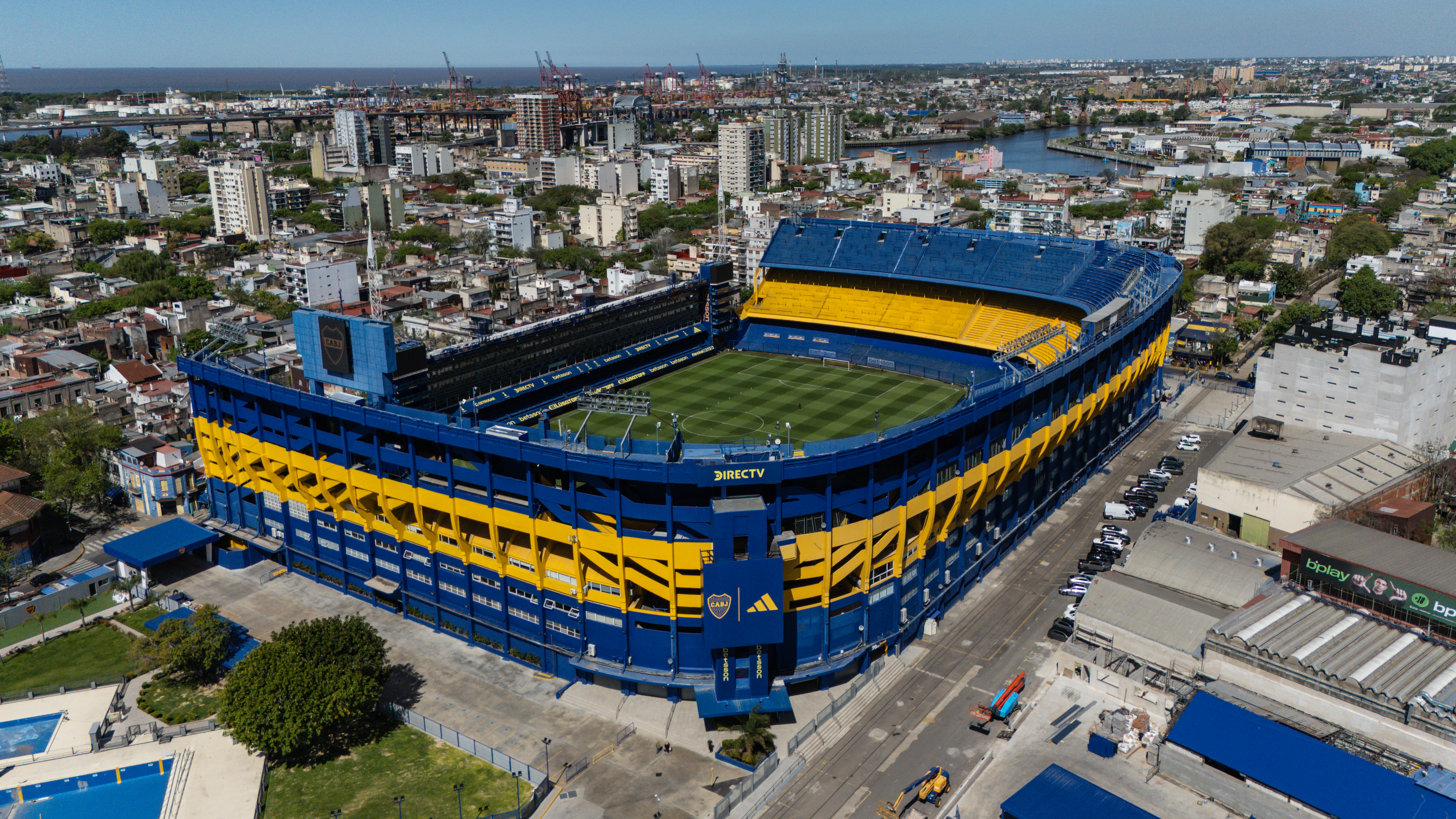
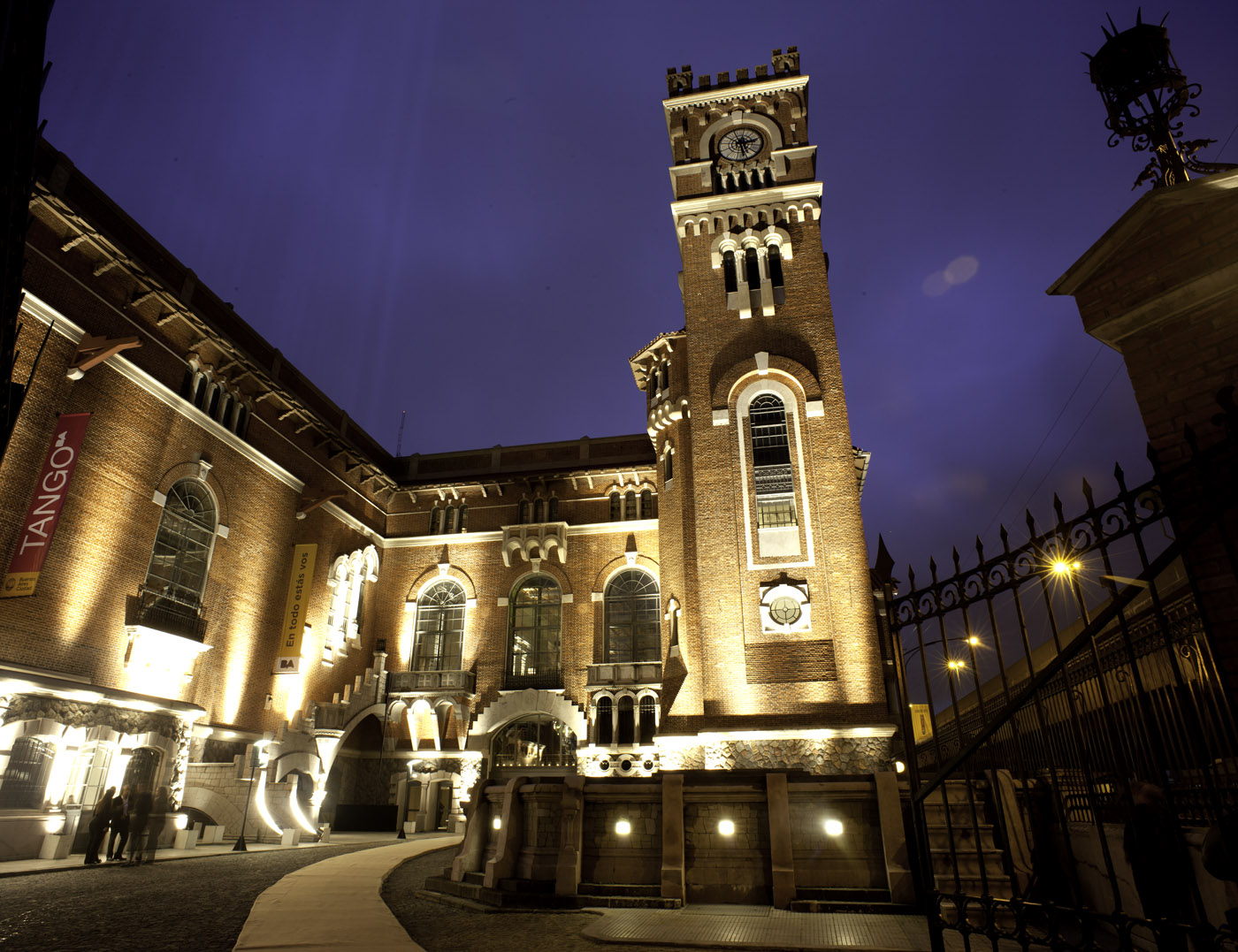
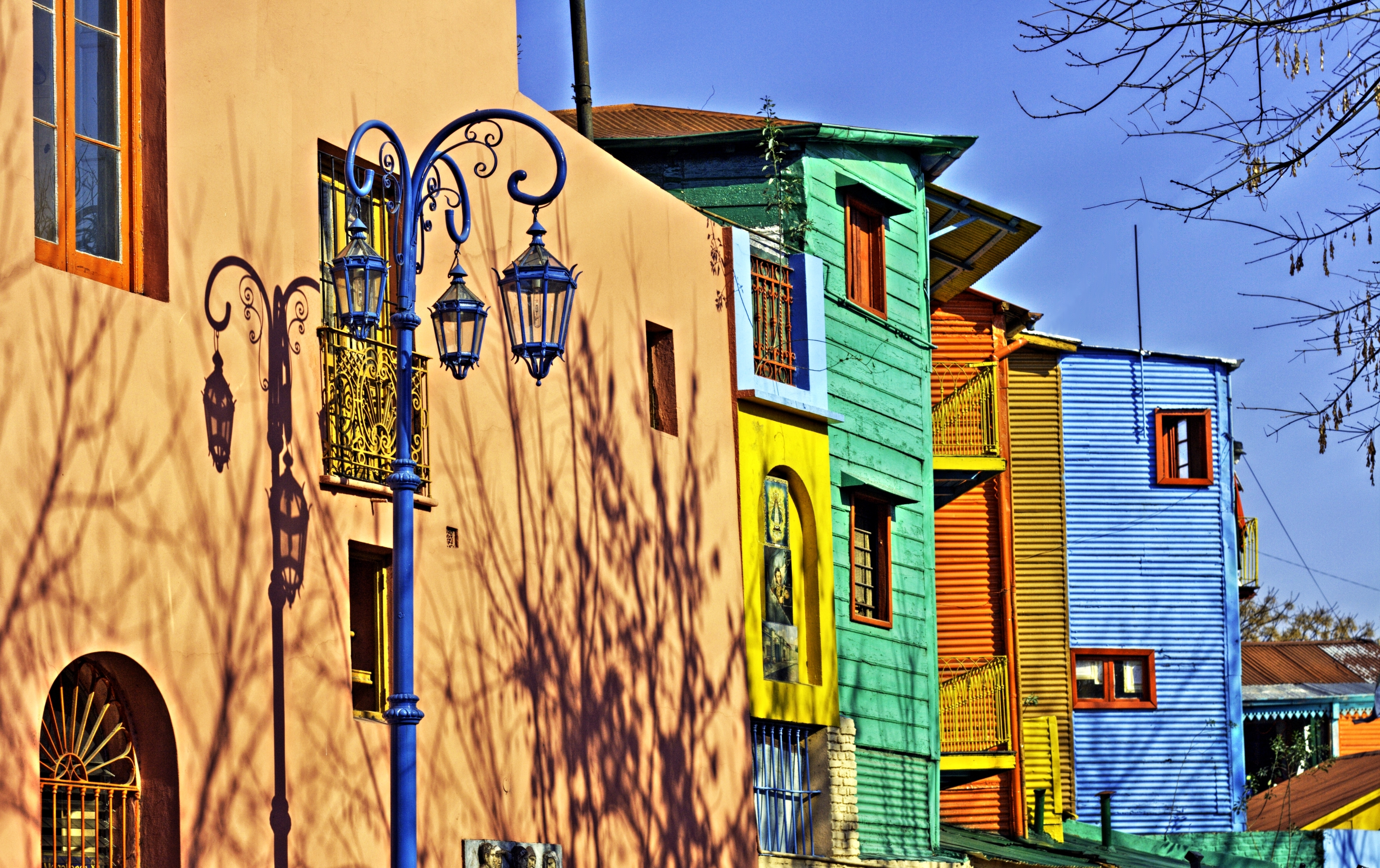
- From top to bottom, left to right: Caminito, Puente Transbordador, colorful buildings in Pedro de Mendoza street, aereal view of La Bombonera, Usina del Arte and "conventillos" or tenements of La Boca.

- Emblem
- Interactive map of La Boca
- Country: Argentina
- Autonomous City: Buenos Aires
- Comuna: C4
- Important sites: Caminito, Estadio Alberto J. Armando

Area
  - Total: 3.3 km^{2} (1.3 sq mi)

Population (2022)
  - Total: 44,205
  - Density: 13,000/km^{2} (35,000/sq mi)
- Time zone: UTC−3 (ART)

La Boca (Spanish: [la ˈβoka]; "the Mouth", probably of the Matanza River) is a neighborhood (barrio) of Buenos Aires, the capital of Argentina.

Its location near the Port of Buenos Aires meant the neighbourhood became a melting pot of different cultures during the 20th century, when millions of immigrants from Europe and Asia arrived to Argentina. In particular, many of its settlers originated from the Italian region of Liguria. The neighbourhood became a cornerstone for porteño culture, being an important site during the early development of the tango.

Today, it is mostly known for being home to Boca Juniors, one of the two largest sports clubs in Argentina.

== Geography ==
La Boca is located in the south-east of the city, near its old port. Another of the 48 barrios, Barracas, lies to the west; San Telmo and Puerto Madero are to the north. On the opposite (right) bank of the Matanza River to the south is the Dock Sud neighborhood of Avellaneda Partido (Buenos Aires Province), with the two areas connected by the Puente Nicolás Avellaneda.

== History ==
In 1882, after a lengthy general strike, La Boca seceded from Argentina, and the rebels raised the Genoese flag, which was immediately torn down personally by then President Julio Argentino Roca.

Among sports fans, Boca is best known for being the home of the world-renowned football club Boca Juniors. The club plays its home matches in Estadio Alberto J. Armando, popularly known as La Bombonera (Spanish for "the bonbon box").

Flag of the micronation Republic of La Boca.

La Boca was home to the garra, or a fighting spirit that was represented in the hard working, no nonsense people of the barrio and reflected by the most popular club Boca Juniors on the pitch. Throughout the first half of the 20th century, La Boca's citizenry was characterized for rejecting “art for arts sake” and adopting a workmanlike attitude to work and life, in contrast to the richer citizens to the north, often represented through their club River Plate. In 1907, La Boca became its own micronational republic. Their first attempt was short-lived, but two later attempts were more successful. The former lasted from 1923 to 1972 and the latter was established since 1986. Republic graffiti was still present in the barrio.

Another of Argentina's most popular clubs, River Plate, originally started in the La Boca. However, in 1938 the club relocated to the Núñez neighborhood on the northern edge of the city and became more identifiable with the Buenos Aires elite than the lower class citizens of La Boca. The land in and around La Boca was often controlled by the state or wealthy corporations in the first half of the 20th century, due to its location near the docks, making soccer pitches difficult to obtain for citizens.

La Boca is a popular destination for tourists visiting Argentina, with its colourful houses and pedestrian street, the Caminito, where tango dancers perform and tango-related memorabilia is sold. Other attractions include the La Ribera theatre, many tango music clubs, and Italian taverns. The area visited by tourists is only a few blocks long and has been built up for tourism very actively over the last few years, with many market stalls and restaurants catering to tourists. Outside this tourist area, it is a fairly poor neighborhood that has had many regular occurrences of petty crimes reported.

It has also been a centre for radical politics, having elected the first socialist member of the Argentine Congress (Alfredo Palacios in 1935) and was home to many demonstrations during the crisis of 2001.

As of 2016, the health of over 1,000 La Boca citizens is threatened by the pollution of the Matanza-Riachuelo River (which contains high levels of arsenic and lead, due to centuries of unrestrained pollution).

== Gallery ==
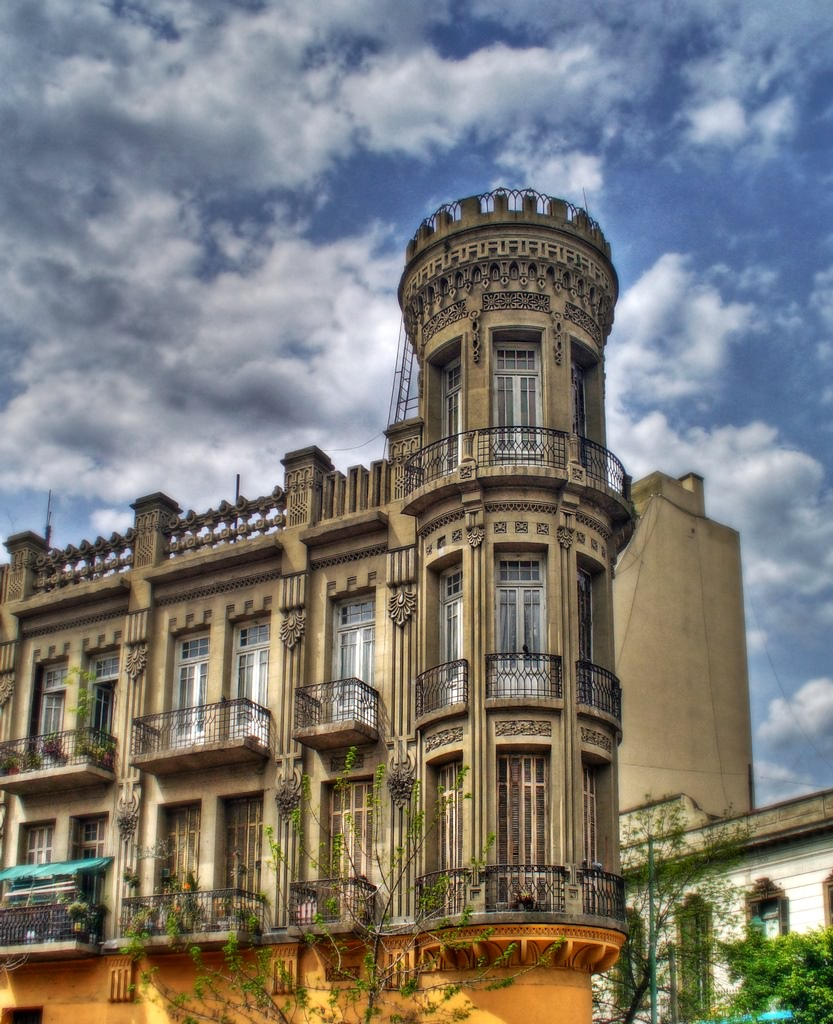
Nineteenth-century Ghost Tower, on Wenceslao Villafañe Street

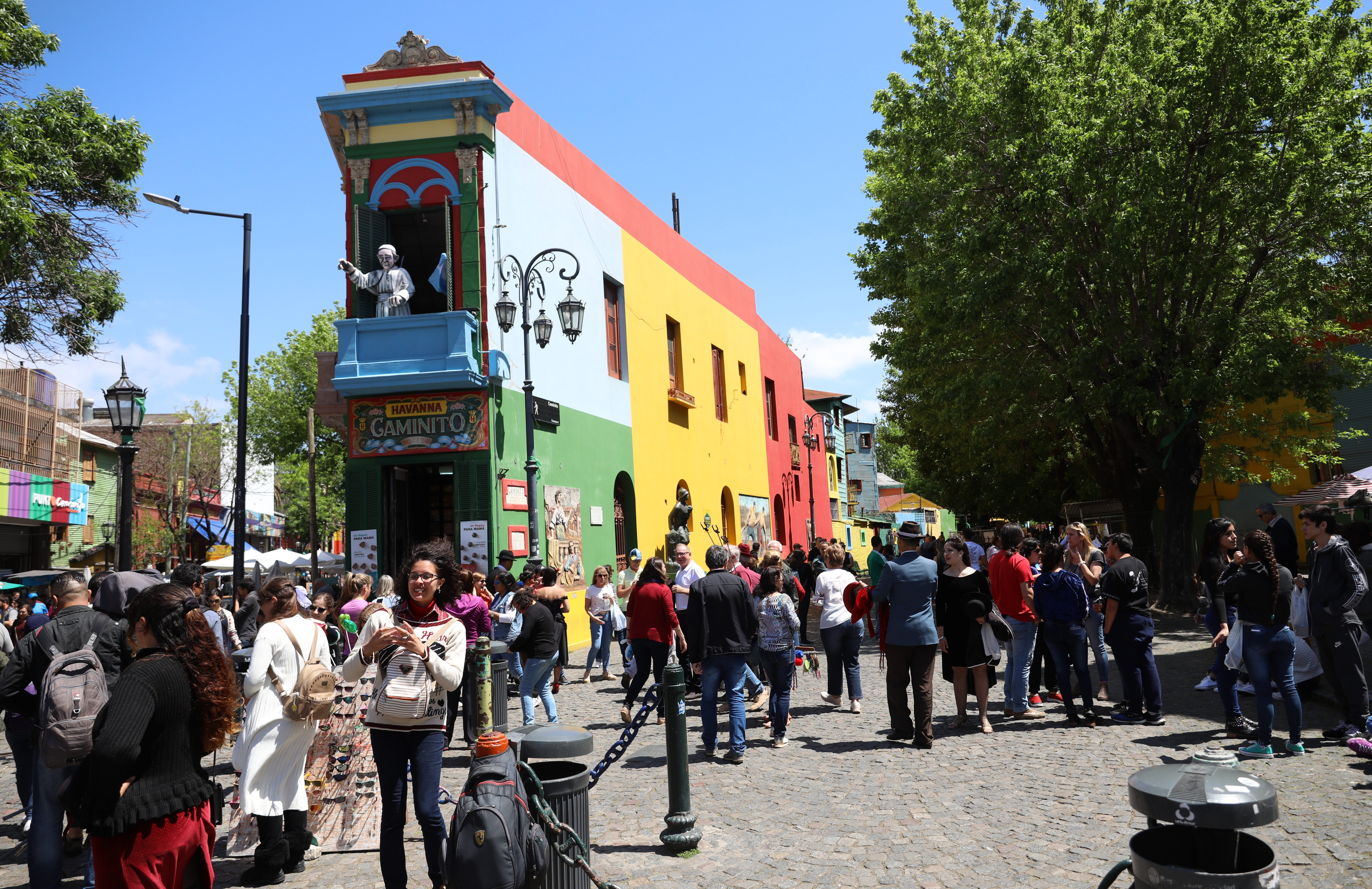
The Caminito of tango lore, an example of the colour of La Boca attributable to local artist Benito Quinquela Martín

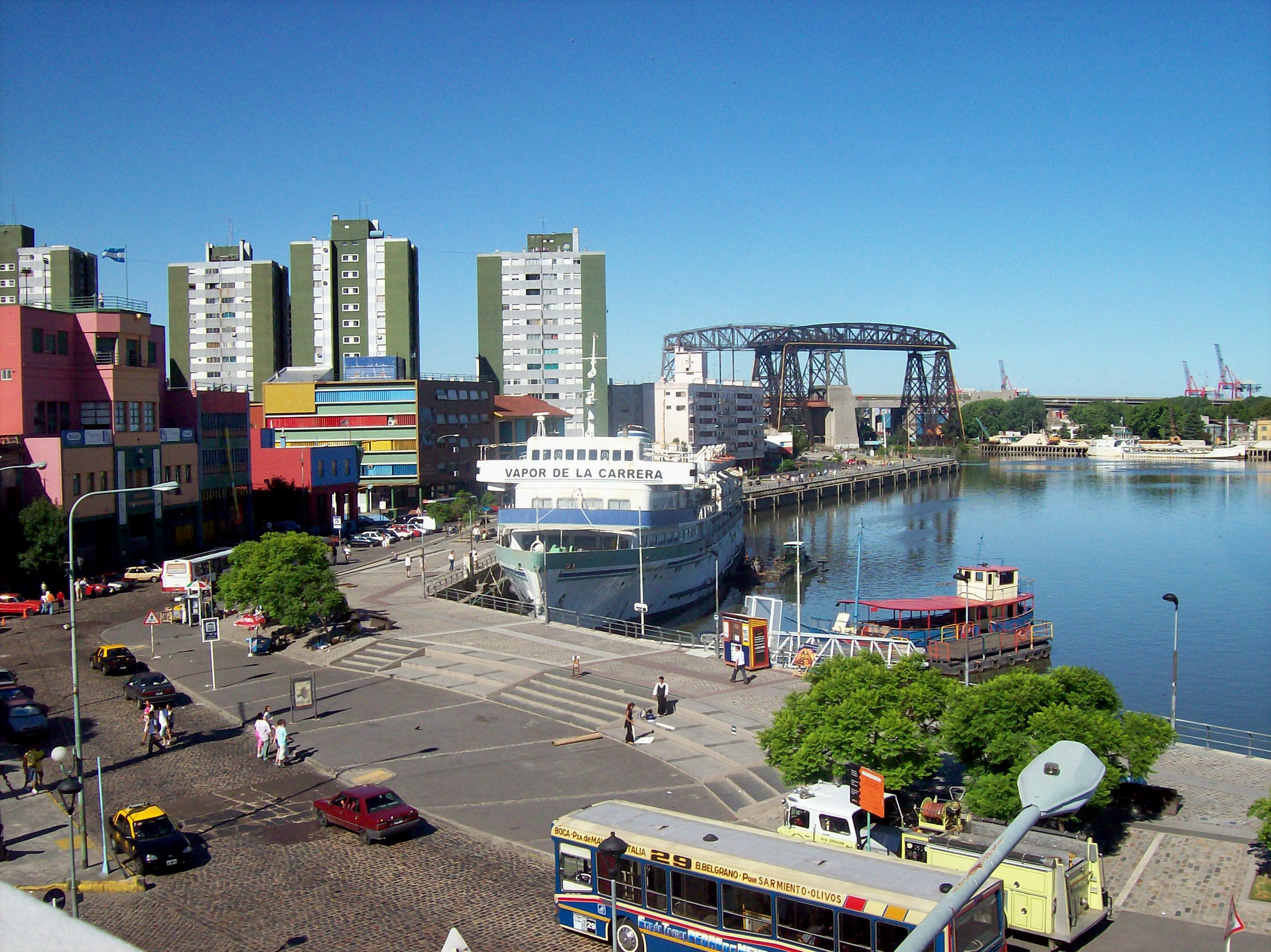
The riverwalk at the Rocha Bend of the Riachuelo River

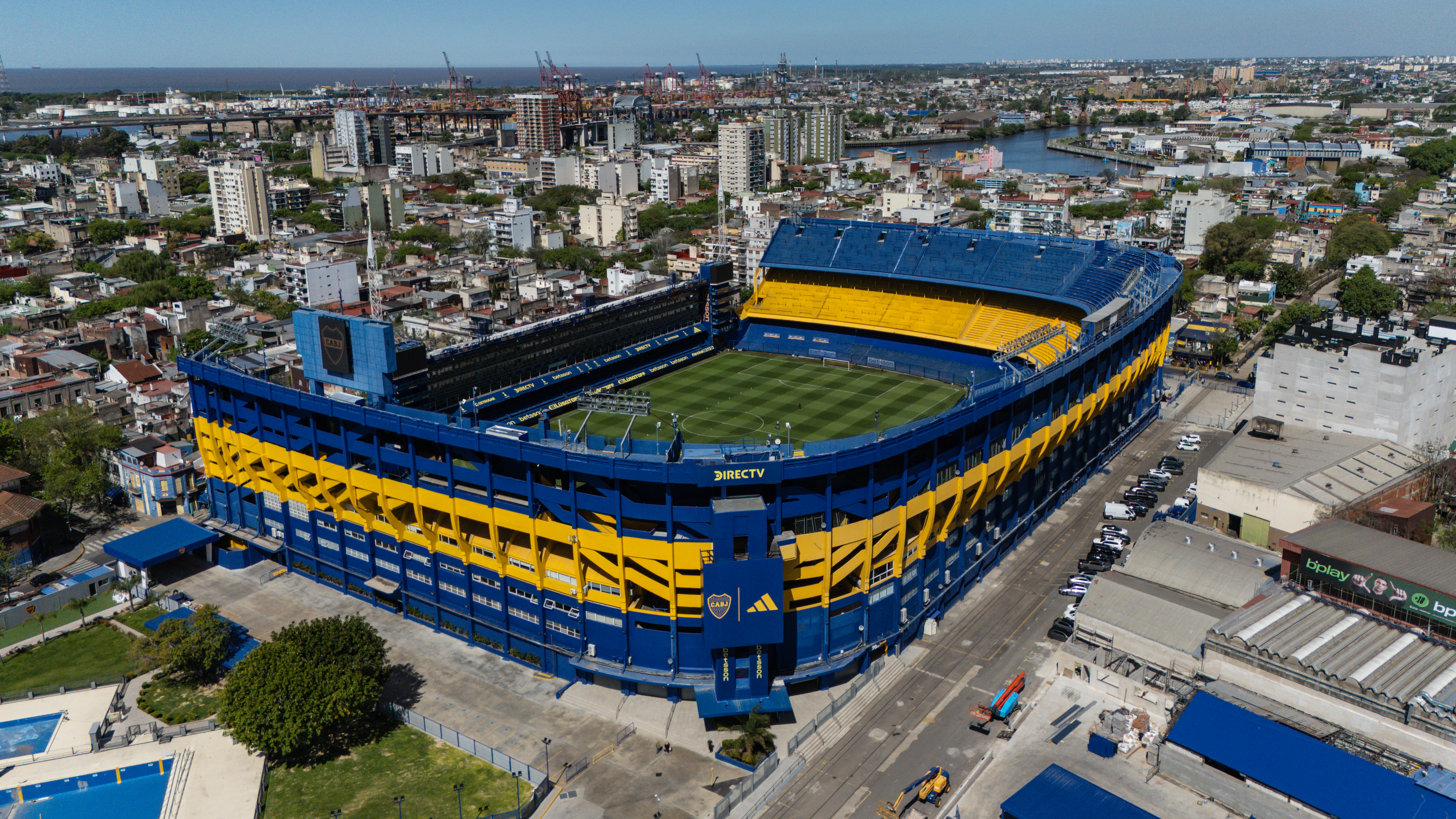
La Bombonera Stadium

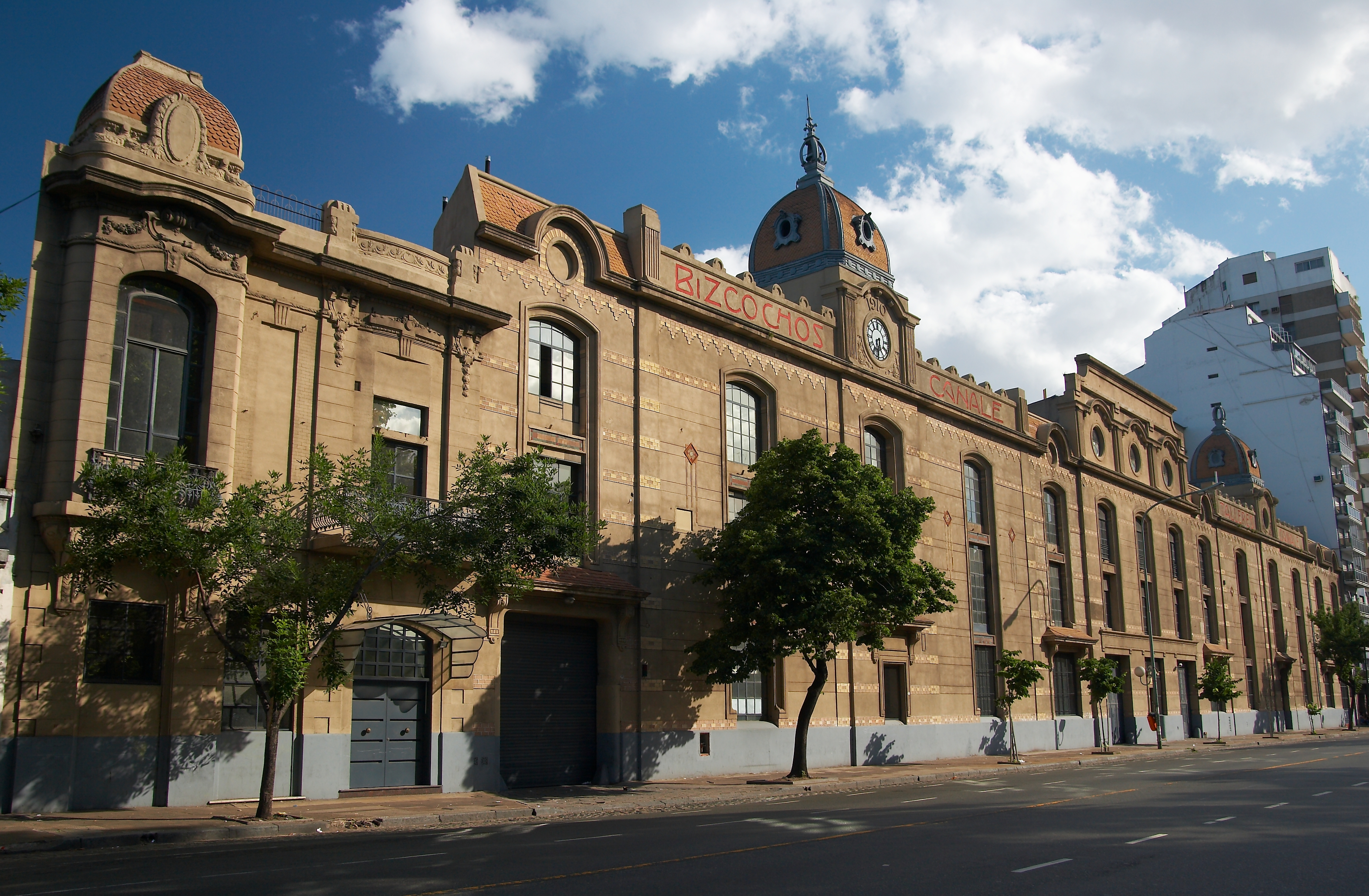
The former Canale Biscuit Co. factory, now upscale lofts

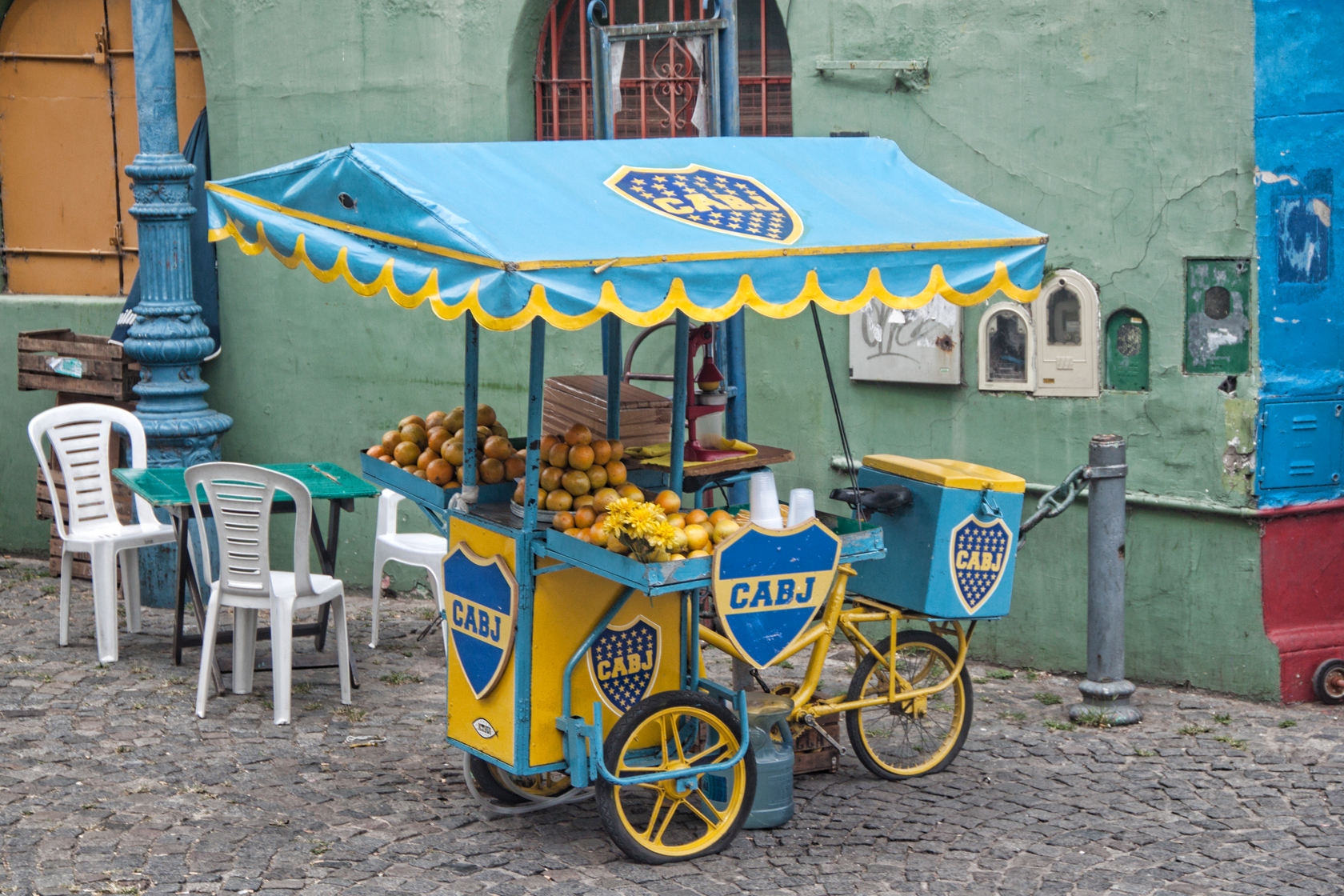
Boca Juniors-themed street vendor

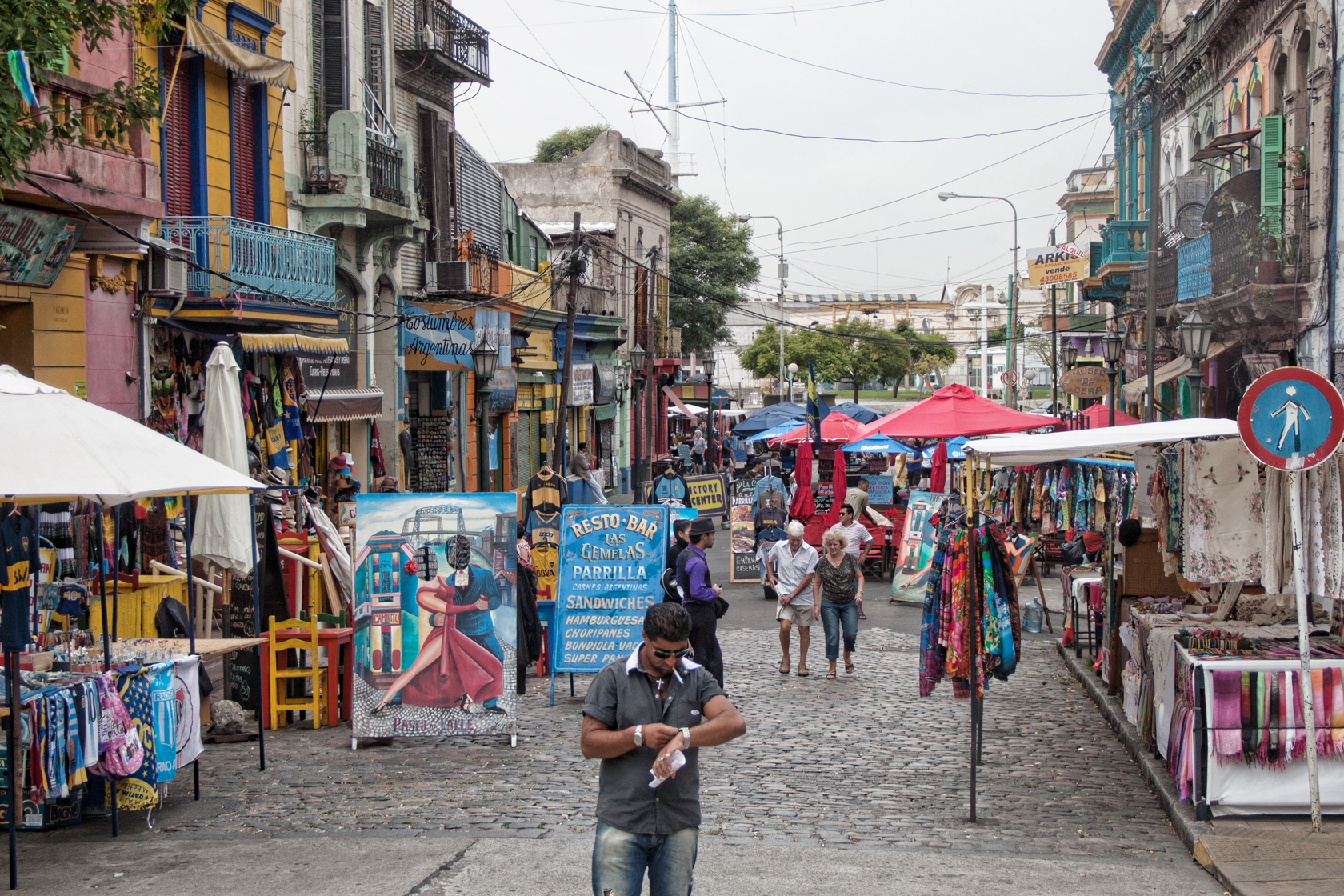
Typical local street

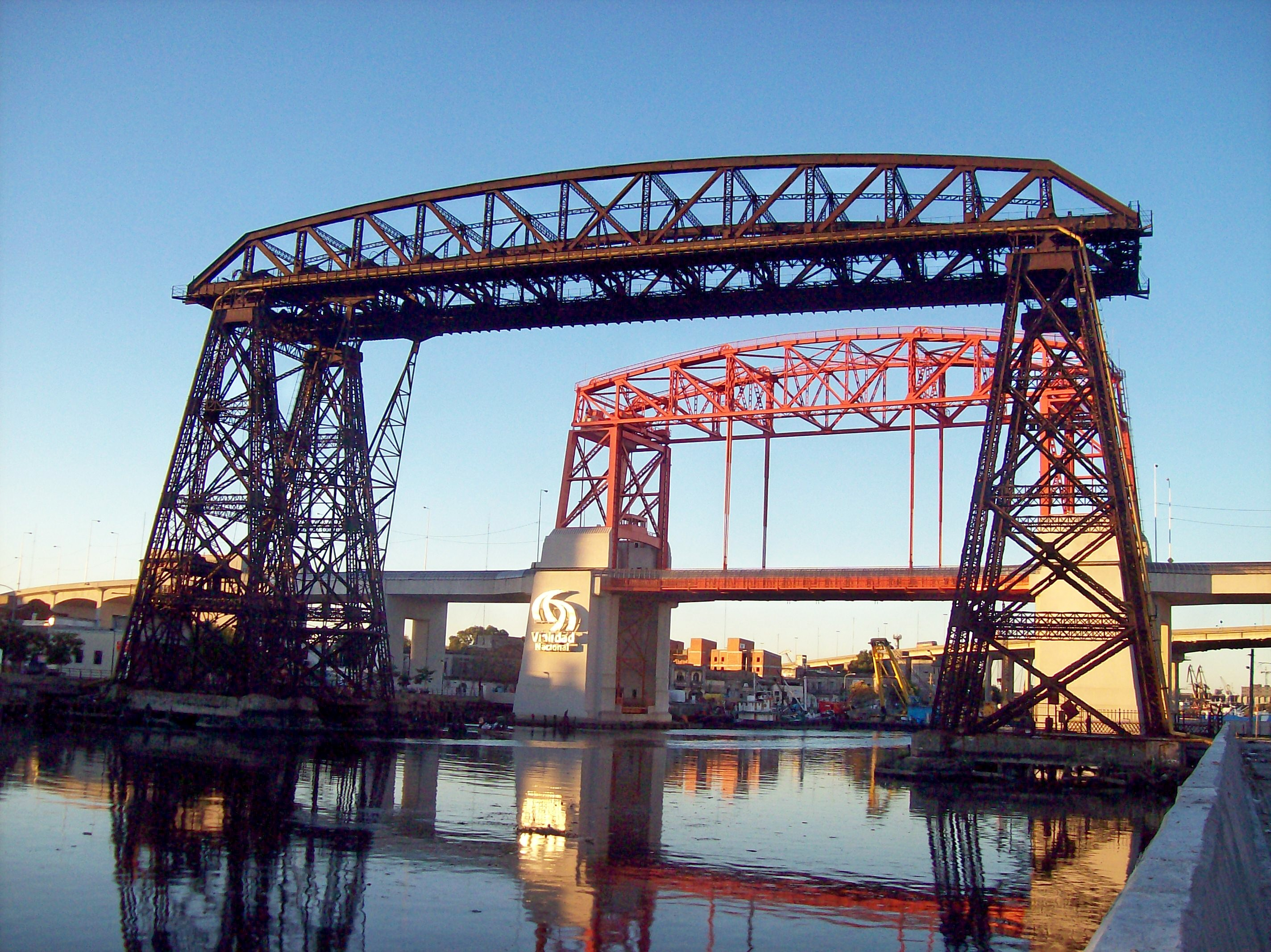
Puente Transbordador

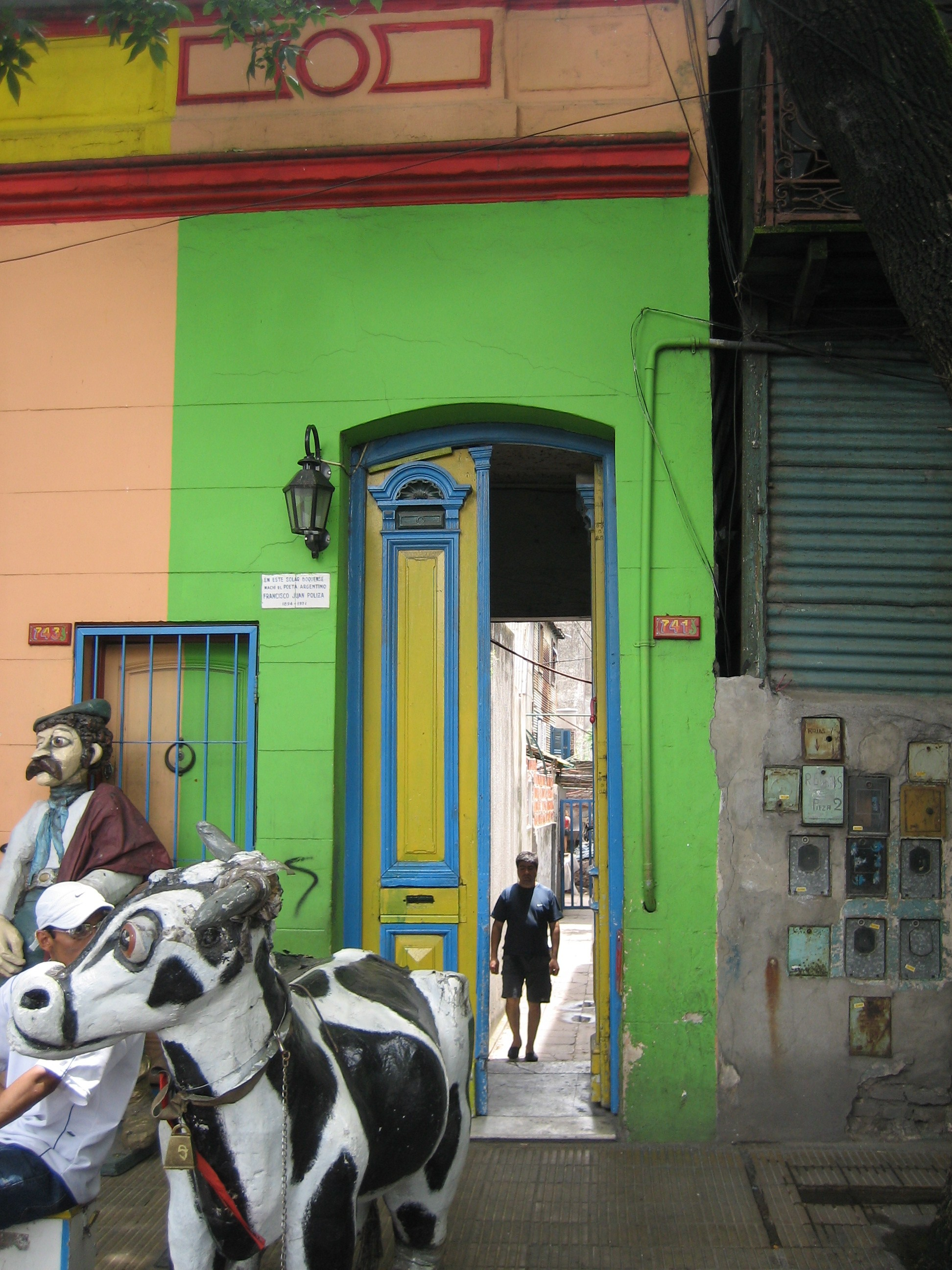
Aráoz de Lamadrid 741

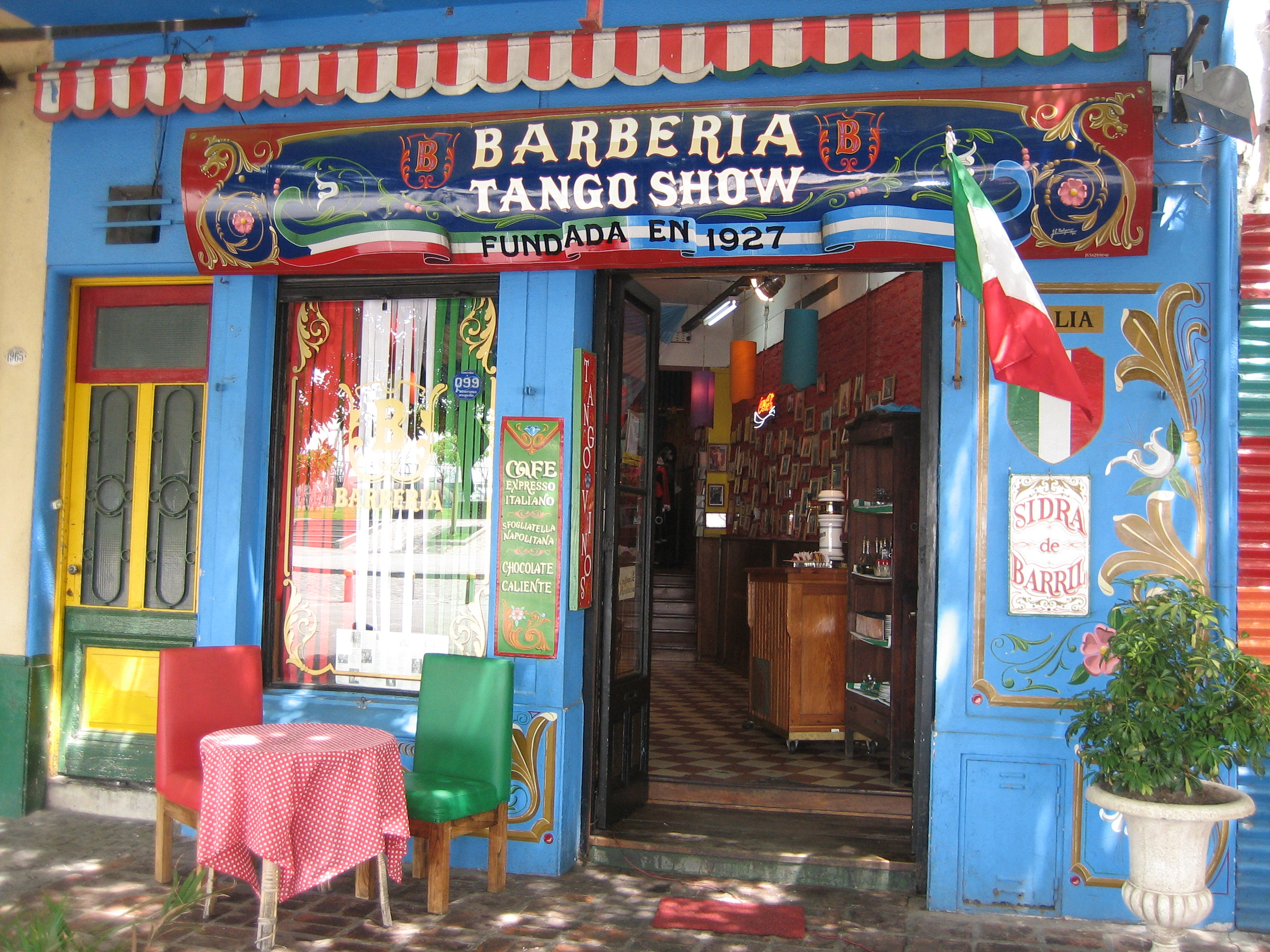
Barberia Tango Show
