= Usina del Arte =

Major cultural venue in Buenos Aires

Usina del Arte The Arts Powerhouse
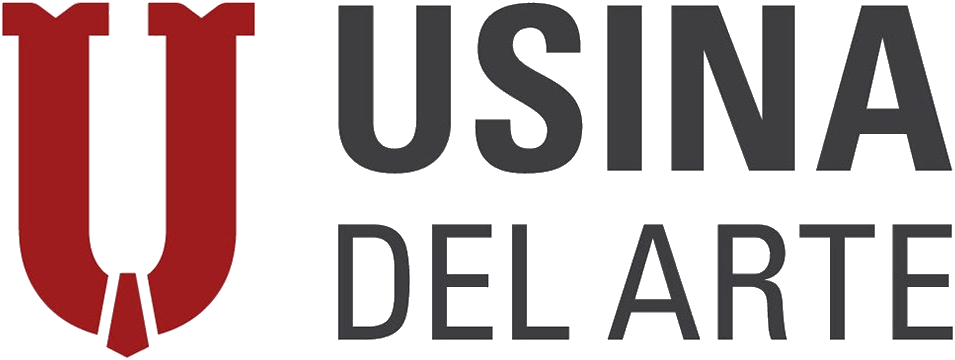

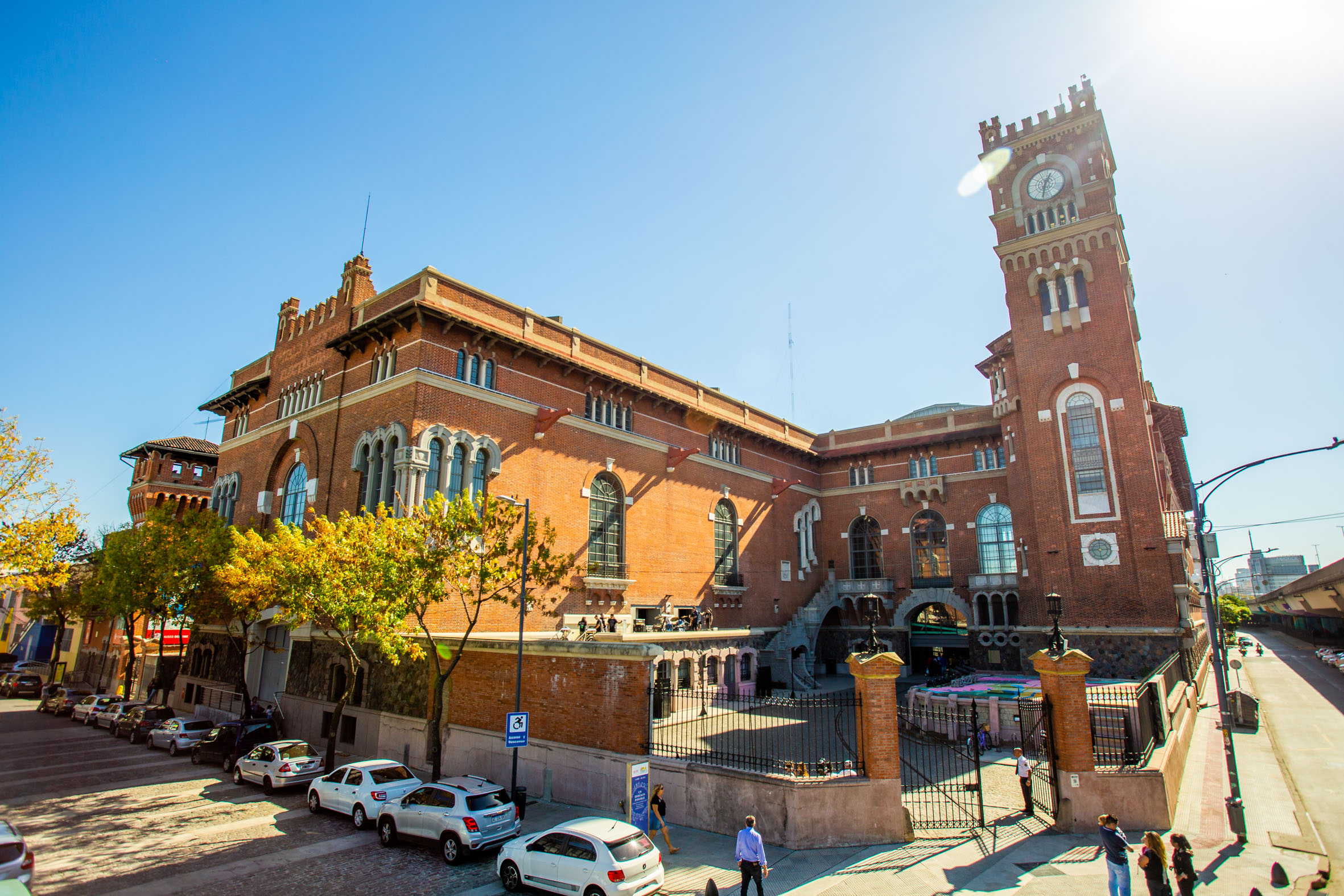
- View of the building in 2019
- Interactive map of the Usina del Arte; The Arts Powerhouse area
- Former names: Italo-Argentina Electricity Works Power Plant (Usina de la Compañía Italo-Argentina de Electricidad, CIAE)

General information
- Type: Former power station
- Architectural style: Eclecticism (Florentine Renacentist)
- Classification: Multidisciplinary Cultural Center and Concert Hall
- Location: Agustín Caffarena 1, Buenos Aires, Argentina
- Coordinates: 34°37′43.59″S 58°21′25.56″W
- Year built: 1914–16
- Opened: 1916; 110 years ago May 2012; 14 years ago (as cultural center)
- Renovated: 2007–12 (first stage)
- Owner: City of Buenos Aires
- Operator: Government of the city

Technical details
- Material: Brick
- Size: 15,000 m2

Design and construction
- Architect: Giovanni Chiogna

Other information
- Parking: Yes

Website
- usinadelarte.ar

The Usina del Arte (lit. "The Arts Powerhouse") is a cultural centre and auditorium located on the former Don Pedro de Mendoza Power Plant ("usina" in Spanish) at La Boca neighborhood, Buenos Aires. It was built between 1912 and 1916 for the Italo-Argentina Electricity Company (Compañía Italo-Argentina de Electricidad, CIAE) in Florentine Renacentist style

After being abandoned through decades, the government of the city of Buenos Aires refurbished the building to become a cultural center, being reopened in May 2012 with the inauguration of a symphonic auditorium with capacity for 1,200 people. Two months later, the chamber room was opened.

== History ==
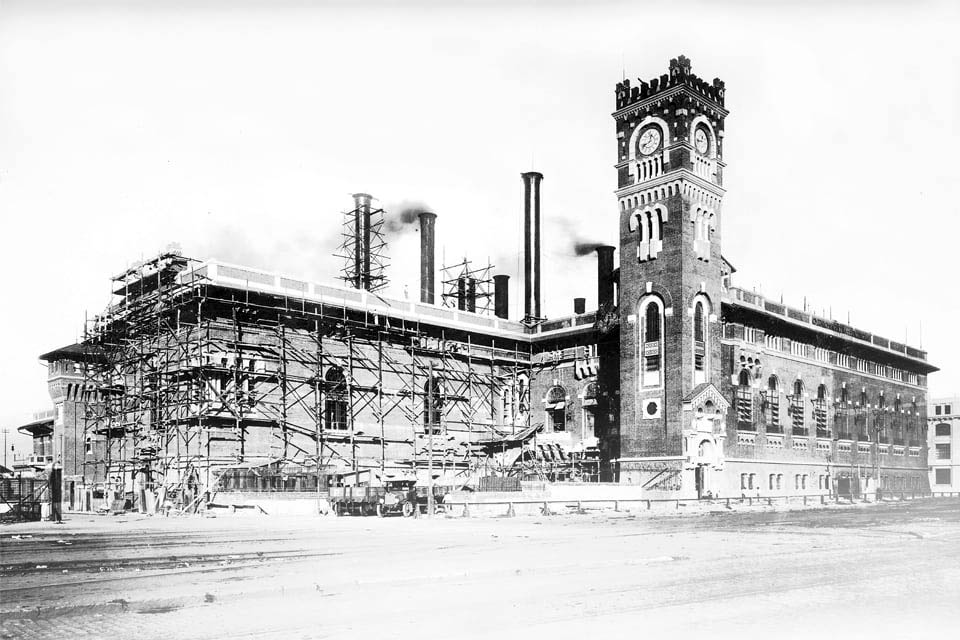
The building under construction c. 1914

The building was designed by the Italian architect Juan Chiogna to house a power plant of the Italo-Argentine Electricity Company (Compañía Italo-Argentina de Electricidad, abbrevriated "CIAE") and built by the company Martignone and Sons between 1912 and 1916, when it was inaugurated. Between 1919 and 1921, the complex was expanded with new facilities to supply the growing demand of Buenos Aires. For the next 80 years it worked providing electricity to the city, until the service was nationalized in the 1990s. The building was later abandoned by the state company and fell into disrepair.

After a decade of abandonment, between August and September 2000, the national and city governments agreed on a joint program to undertake the recovery of the structure as the headquarters of the Auditorium of the City of Buenos Aires and definitive headquarters of the National symphonic and philharmonic orchestras of Buenos Aires. The project included a large nave in which two halls or auditoriums would function (one for 1,700 spectators and the other for 500) with a transversal route designed to unify the two entrances, and a secondary body where offices, businesses, cafeterias and more services such as sales of instruments or sheet music were to be located.

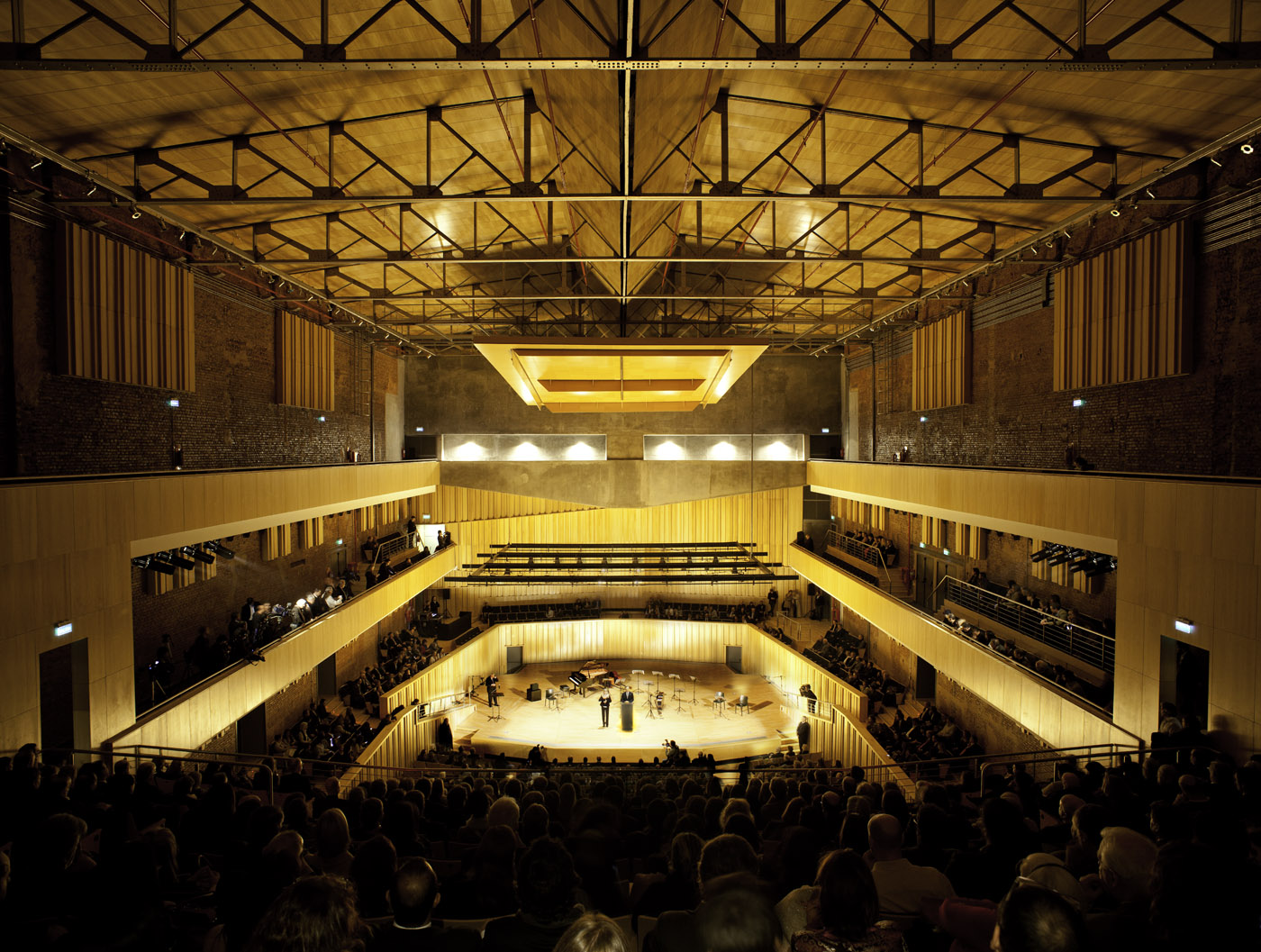
Concert held in Usina del Arte during its inauguration as cultural center in May 2012

The property was under the control of ONABE ("National Agency for the Administration of State Assets"), which required proof that the building was suitable for the stipulated purpose prior to its transfer. A professional team of architects was then formed, that team prepared the preliminary design submitted to ONABE, and the building's use as an auditorium was approved just days before the 2001 crisis.

The reopening of the building had three stages, the first stage consisted in the inauguration of Salón Dorado, exhibition room, access backyard, Pedro de Mendoza Annex, ticket offices, toilettes, and elevators.

The second stage came at the end of May 2012, a new name change for the cultural center was announced, becoming "Usina del Arte," and the inauguration of the complex's main hall was made public. The symphonic auditorium had a capacity for 1,200 spectators, and was opened to the public with a tribute to Astor Piazzolla, although access was only possible for specific events, during restricted hours.

In May 2012, the Sala de Cámara was opened completing the third stage, it had a capacity for 280 people. The auditorium was suitable not only for chamber music orchestras but plays.

== Architecture ==
The building stands out for its distinctive Italianate late Gothic or early Renacentist architecture and its clock tower which can be seen from a distance, especially from the La Plata freeway that today bestrides it, "an almost exact reproduction of the Florentine Palazzo Della Signoria". The interiors are large rooms that were used for electric generators, with iron truss roofs and a zinc sheet roof.

This power plant was the largest of a series of buildings designed to house the facilities of the Italo-Argentina Electricity Company throughout the city by the Italian architect Giovanni Chiogna, seeking to achieve a common aesthetic denominator that would make all the buildings identifiable with the company: this architecture is immediately recognizable by its exposed brick walls, semicircular or segmental arches in doors and windows (often with the keystone highlighted), blind arches, friezes with moldings, the company heraldry in coats of arms applied to the walls, pediments with the company name engraved in elegant letters, rosettes, skylights, battlements, whimsical decorative details and occasionally a tower; everything with lines that remind us of the European twelfth century.

The square tower with battlements, the inclusion of the clock, the use of gargoyles and semicircular arches with the addition of the exposed bricks and plaster elements imitating stone blocks that the Pedro de Mendoza Powerhouse shows on its exterior summarize just some of the characteristics that Chiogna used in all the works carried out for the CIAE and almost simultaneously with the completion of this one. Of a similar category were their interior spaces, where the presence of pillars, corbels, ironwork elements and even the floors with the company logo refer to the importance of conceiving an integral project.

== Artists performing ==
Some of the concerts held in Usina del Arte have been: Las Pelotas, Zubin Mehta, Horacio Lavandera, Israel Chamber Orchestra (directed by Yoav Talmi), Buenos Aires Chamber Orchestra, Susana Rinaldi, Tan Biónica, among others.
