= Puente Transbordador =

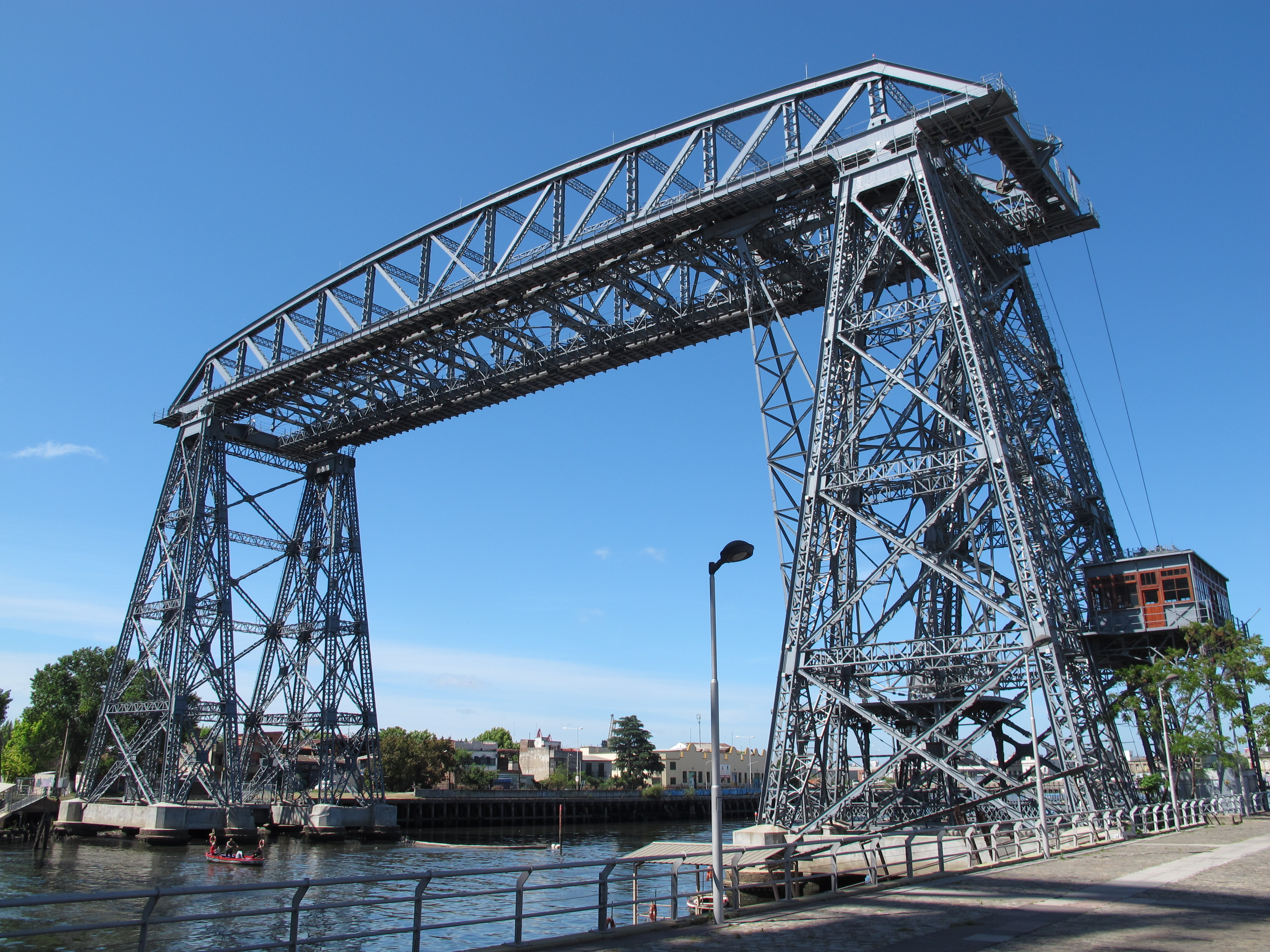
- The bridge in 2018
- Coordinates: 34°38′18″S 58°21′23″W
- Carries: Pedestrians, carts, cars and trams
- Crosses: Riachuelo River
- Locale: Buenos Aires, Argentina
- Official name: Transbordador del Riachuelo Nicolás Avellaneda
- Named for: Nicolás Avellaneda
- Heritage status: National Historic Monument of Argentina

Characteristics
- Design: Truss

History
- Construction start: 25 September 1908
- Opened: 31 May 1914

Puente Transbordador (also known as Buenos Aires Transporter Bridge, Puente Transbordador de La Boca Puente Transbordador Nicolás Avellaneda, Antiguo Puente Nicolás Avellaneda or Transbordador del Riachuelo) is a transporter bridge in Buenos Aires, Argentina. The bridge was in use from its completion in 1914 until 1960, when operation ceased until 2017. Since 1999 the bridge is a National Historic Monument of Argentina.

The transporter bridge was the first link to connect Buenos Aires with the outskirts on the other side of the Riachuelo River. The bridge links the Avenida La Plata in the neighbourhood Island Maciel of Dock Sud with Avenida Almirante Brown in the La Boca neighbourhood of Buenos Aires.

The name of the bridge refers to Nicolás Avellaneda, a former president of Argentina, who also gave the name to the Avellaneda Partido on the right bank of the river.

The platform of the transporter bridge measured 8 by 12 metres and could be operated from a control stand on itself or from the machine house. It was designed to carry pedestrians, carts, cars and trams.

== History ==
On September 25, 1908 the Buenos Aires Great Southern Railway was authorised to build a transporter bridge uniting the city of Buenos Aires with Buenos Aires Province south of the Riachuelo River. Buenos Aires Province bore all the costs of the bridge despite it also serving the Argentinian capital.

The transporter bridge was inaugurated May 31, 1914 and operated until 1960. The Puente Nicolás Avellaneda road bridge (just 100 metres away), was constructed in 1940.

In 1997, plans were announced to restore the bridge at a cost of US$1.2 million. The bridge was slated to resume operation on Thursday 28 September 2017.

In September 2017, the bridge was finally restored and reopened to the public for the first time in 57 years.

== Gallery ==
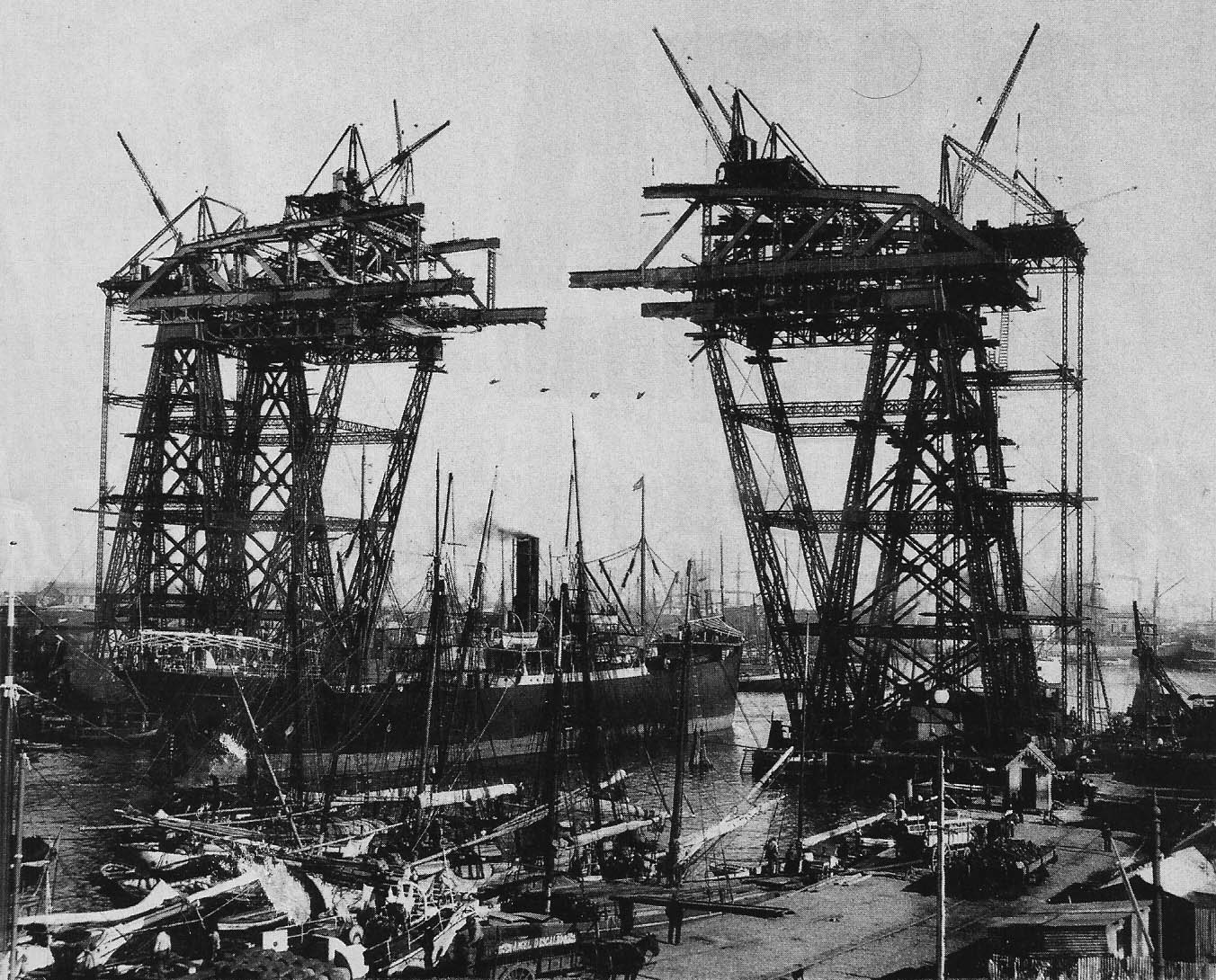
Bridge under construction, 1913

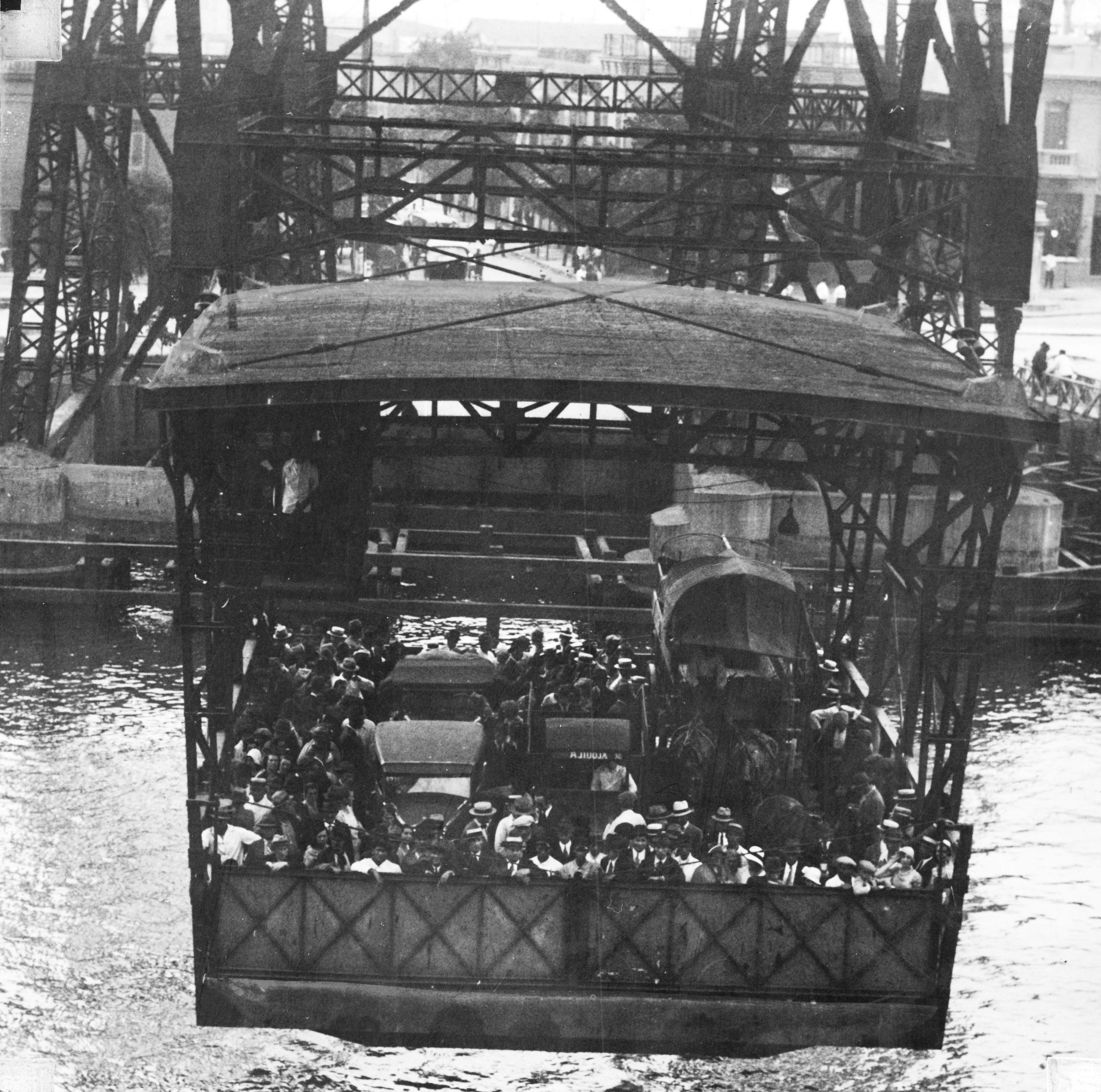
Gondola carrying passengers and cars, 1932

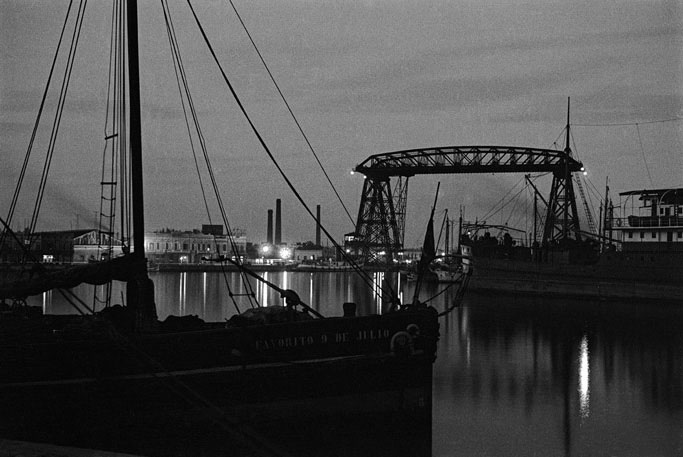
View from Vuelta de Rocha, 1936

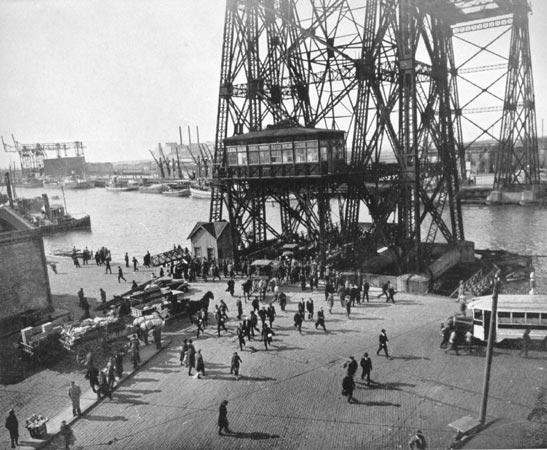
People boarding, 1936

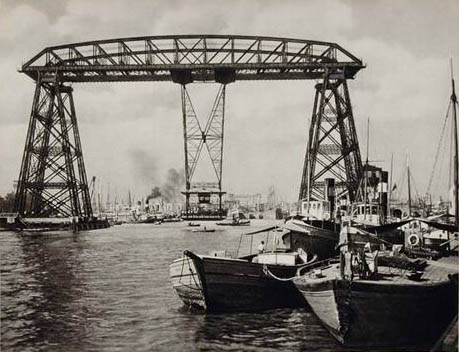
Bridge operating in 1951

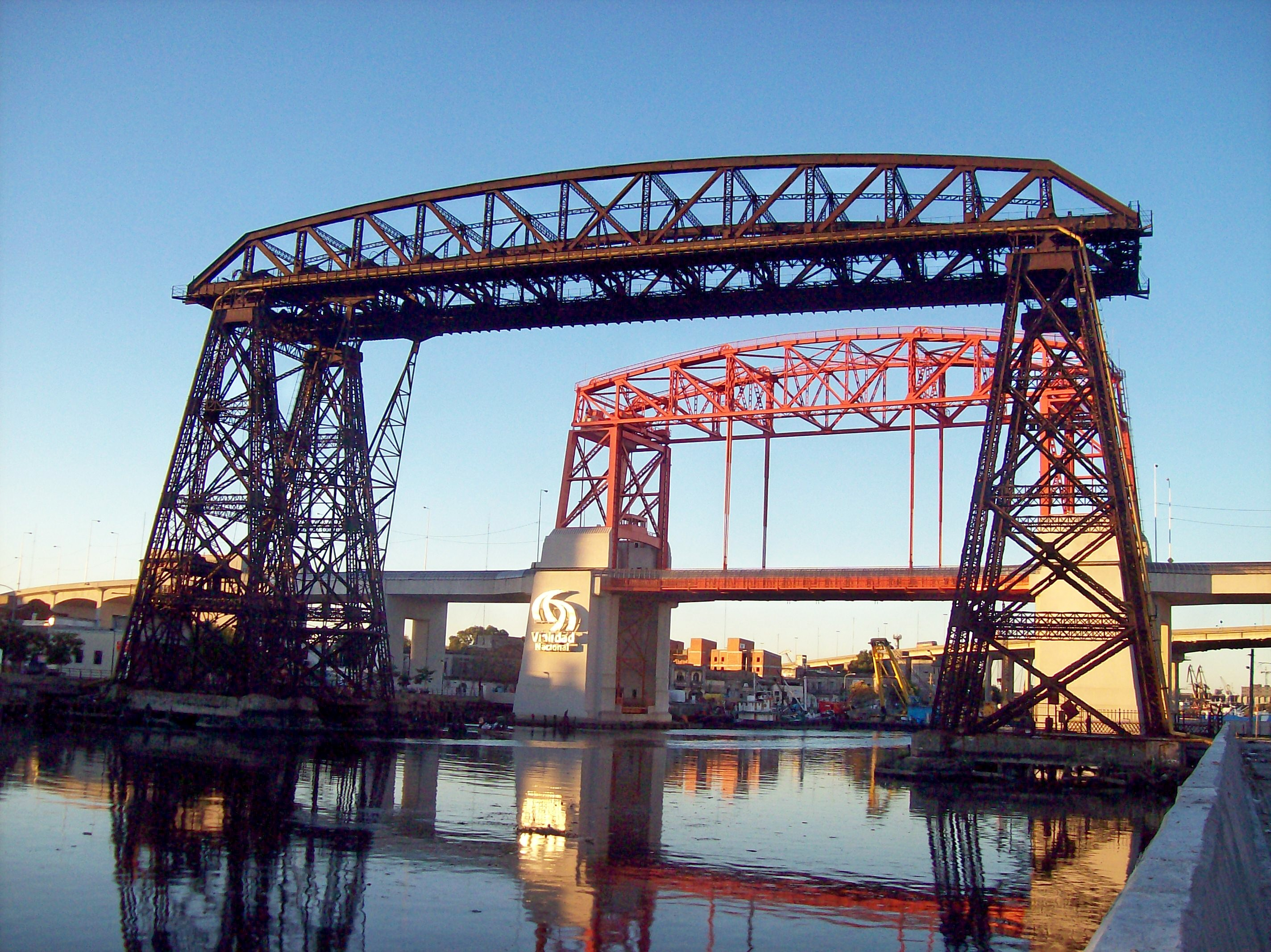
The Nuevo Puente Pueyrredón behind the Transbordador, 2011

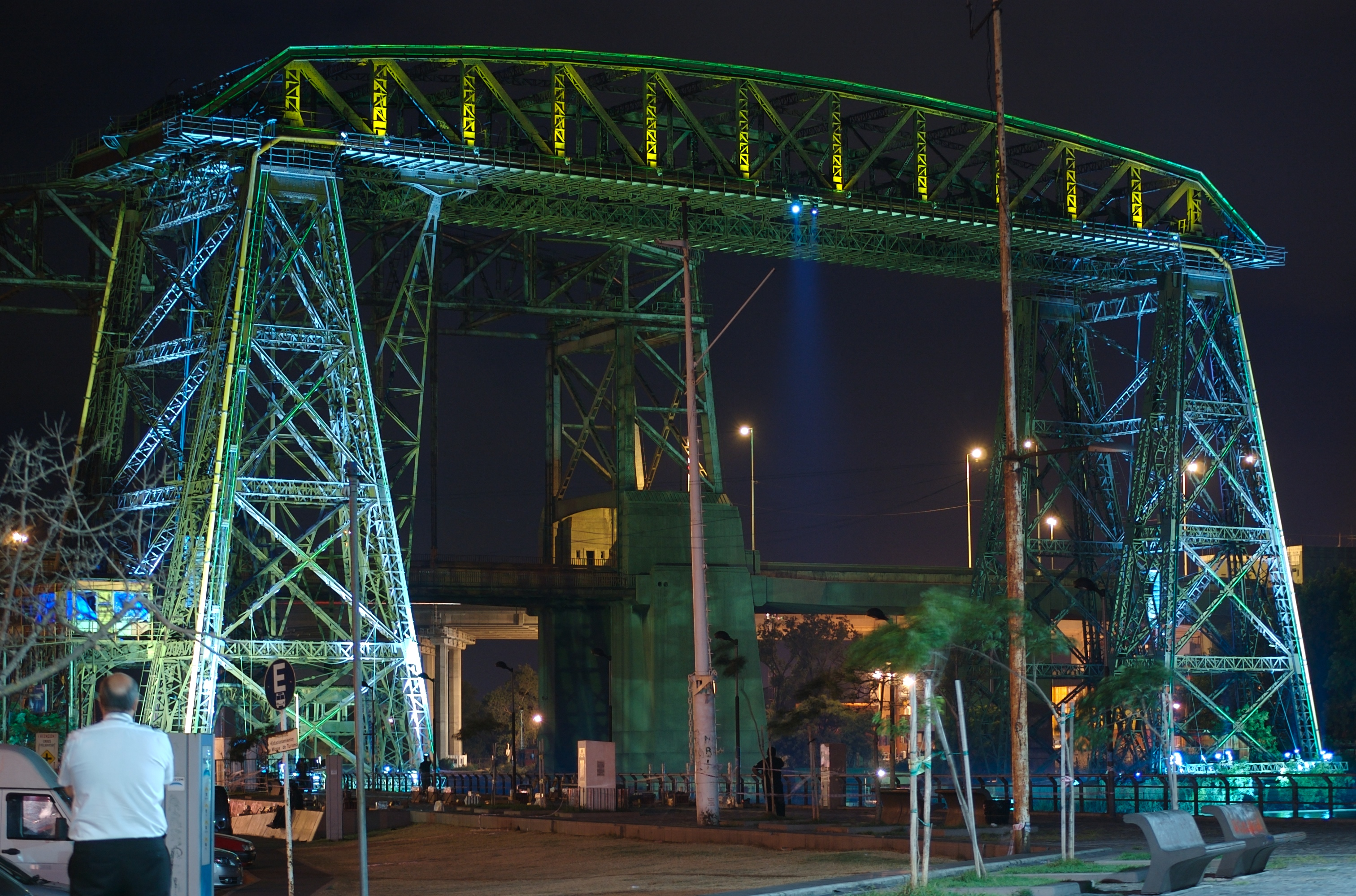
The bridge at night, 2007

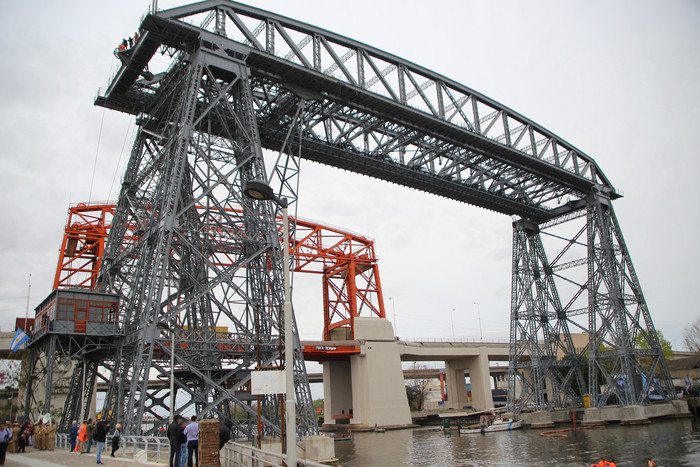
The restored bridge, 2017
