= Governor Oroño Bridge =

Governor Oroño Bridge Puente Gobernador Oroño
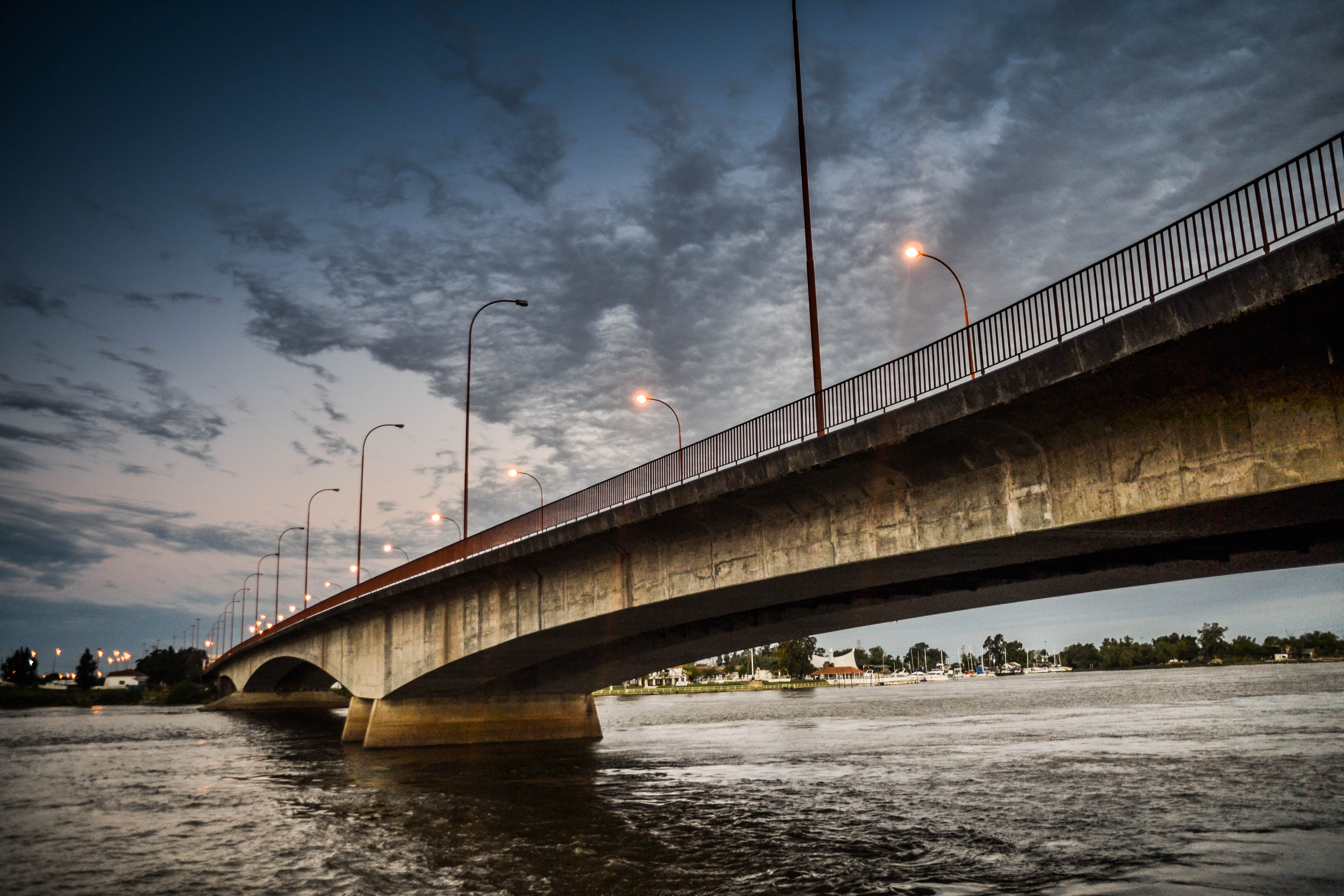
- Coordinates: 31°38′27″S 60°40′53″W
- Crosses: Setúbal Lagoon
- Locale: Santa Fe, Argentina
- Other name(s): Oroño Viaduct; Viaducto Oroño

Characteristics
- Design: Beam bridge
- Material: Concrete

History
- Opened: September 30, 1971

Location
- Interactive map of Governor Oroño Bridge

The Governor Oroño Bridge (Spanish: Puente Gobernador Oroño), also known as the Oroño Viaduct (Spanish: Viaducto Oroño), is one of the road bridges that cross the Setúbal Lagoon, in the city of Santa Fe, in Argentina. It is part of the RN 168 national route that, through the Raúl Uranga – Carlos Sylvestre Begnis tunnel, connects the city of Santa Fe with the city of Paraná.

== History ==
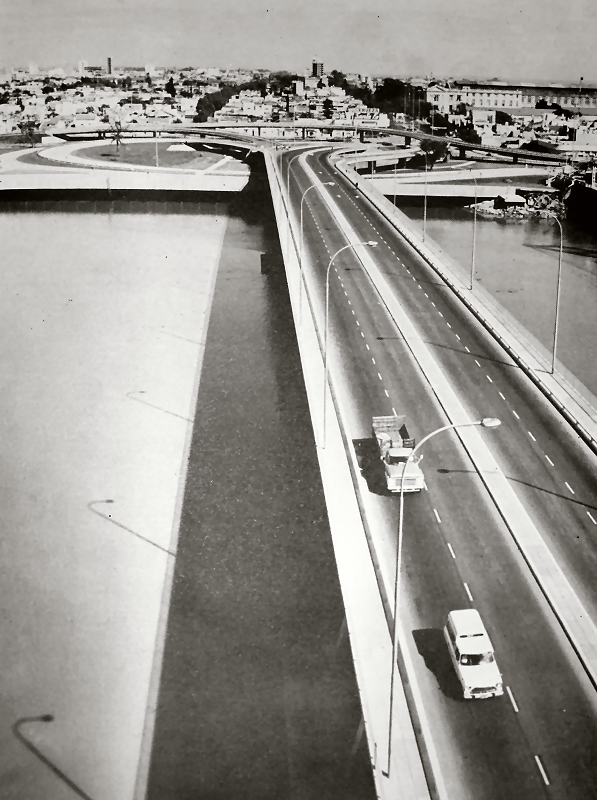
The bridge in 1971

The bridge was officially inaugurated on September 30, 1971.
