= Governor José Manuel de la Sota Bridge =

Governor José Manuel de la Sota Bridge Puente Gobernador José Manuel de la Sota
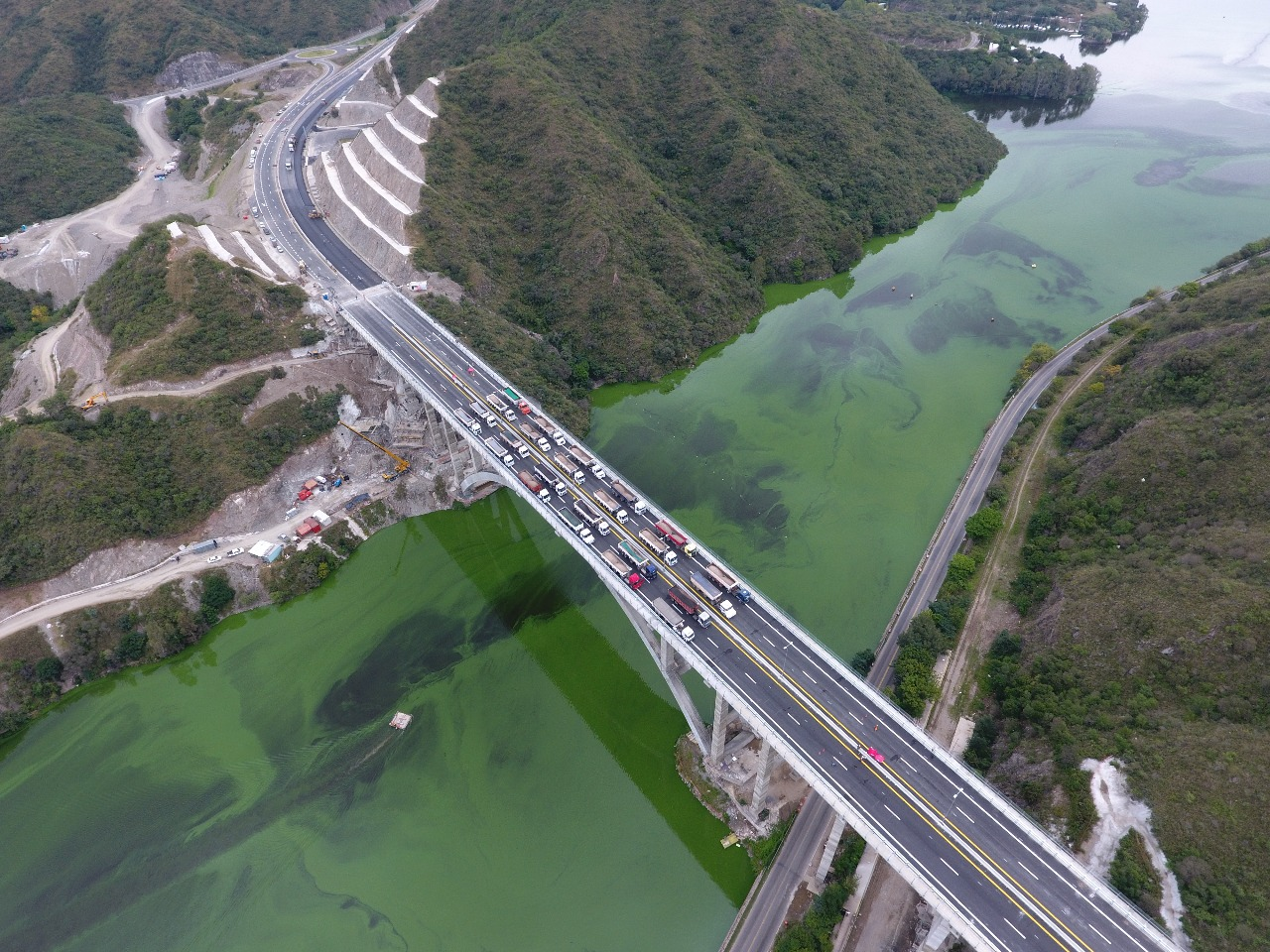
- Coordinates: 31.374007°S 64.441458°W
- Crosses: San Roque Lake
- Locale: Córdoba Province, Argentina

Characteristics
- Design: Arch bridge
- Material: Reinforced concrete

History
- Opened: April 8, 2019

Location
- Interactive map of Governor José Manuel de la Sota Bridge

The Governor José Manuel de la Sota Bridge (Spanish: Puente Gobernador José Manuel de la Sota) is a road project to combine a highway and a provincial route, in the Córdoba Province, Argentina.

== General Considerations ==
The project corresponds to the section of the Costa Azul Bypass located between the Córdoba - Carlos Paz Highway interchange and the San Roque commune, situated in the Punilla Department of the Córdoba Province.

== Recognition ==
In October 2019, the Argentine Road Association awarded the Government of the Province of Córdoba the Technological Innovation Award for the construction of the "José Manuel de la Sota Bridge."
