= Puente Colgante de Santa Fe =

Ingeniero Marcial Candioti Bridge Puente Colgante de Santa Fe
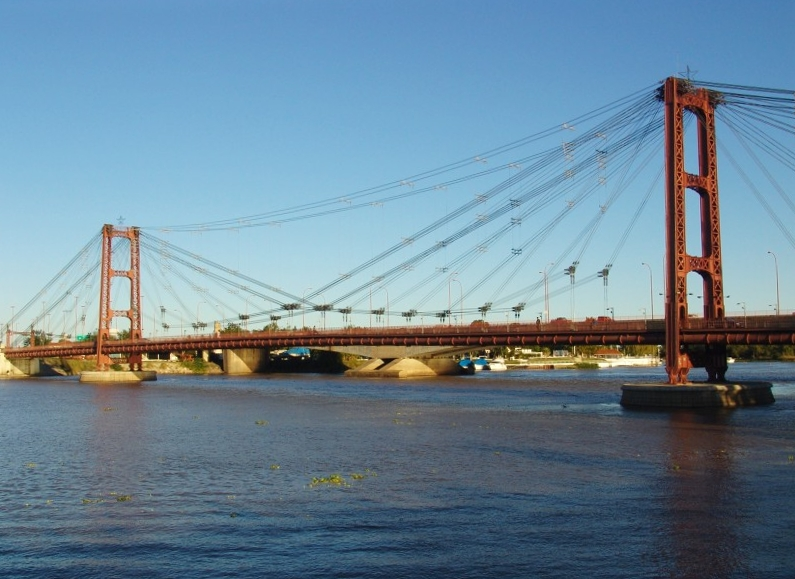
- A view of Puente Colgante de Santa Fe.
- Coordinates: 31°38′24″S 60°40′53″W
- Locale: Santa Fe
- Official name: Puente Ingeniero Marcial Candioti
- Other name(s): Puente Colgante de Santa Fe; Ingeniero Marcial Candioti Bridge

Characteristics
- Design: Suspension bridge

History
- Designer: Marcial Rafael Candioti
- Construction start: 1924
- Construction end: 1928
- Opened: June 8, 1928

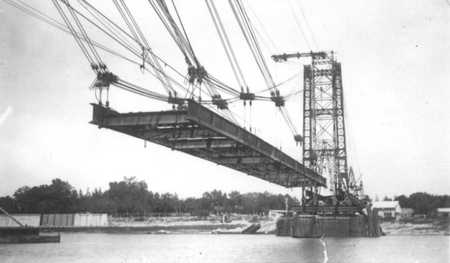
Construction of the bridge, in 1924.

The Ingeniero Marcial Candioti Bridge, better known as the Santa Fe Suspension Bridge (Spanish: Puente Colgante de Santa Fe), is a suspension bridge in the city of Santa Fe, Santa Fe Province, Argentina. It goes across the Setúbal lagoon. It connects the west coast of the lagoon to the east coast of the lagoon. It is also a symbol of the city of Santa Fe and a symbol of its people. It has a long history that includes an almost total collapse in 1983 and its restoration after twenty years.

It was originally made to take water from the Colastiné neighborhood and to connect the city with the Universidad Nacional del Litoral and the El Pozo neighborhood, among other places. The bridge is now a tourist attraction. As a landmark and monument in Santa Fe, it is a meeting point for celebrations, social gatherings and festivities. It has inspired poets, artists, photographers and documentaries.

== Collapse in 1983 ==
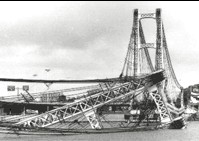
Fall of the Bridge in 1983.

After standing for 55 years, one of its pillars collapsed on September 28, 1983 because of a strong flood that had lasted several months. It was a surprise to everyone, and many photos and videos from the neighbors and journalists of that time show a slow fall. The east antenna collapsed at 4:35 p.m., keeping only half of the structure standing. The Santa Fe newspaper El Litoral published that day, “A goodbye that wants to be see you later". Part of the bridge sank into the Setúbal lagoon and was recovered in 1984. The bridge was not rebuilt until 20 years later.

The administration of the then governor José María Vernet was associated with the image of the fallen bridge. First, due to the interventions of man in the flood valley, caused by the occupation of the river land by buildings, and the mismanagement of dredging.

Second, due to the scandal that produced the verification of irregularities in the sale of parts of the suspension bridge. The recovered material was taken to the city port, where it was left in the custody of the provincial government. Months later, that material was sold for scrap.
