= Puente Nicolás Avellaneda =

Coordinates: 34.638017°S 58.355706°W

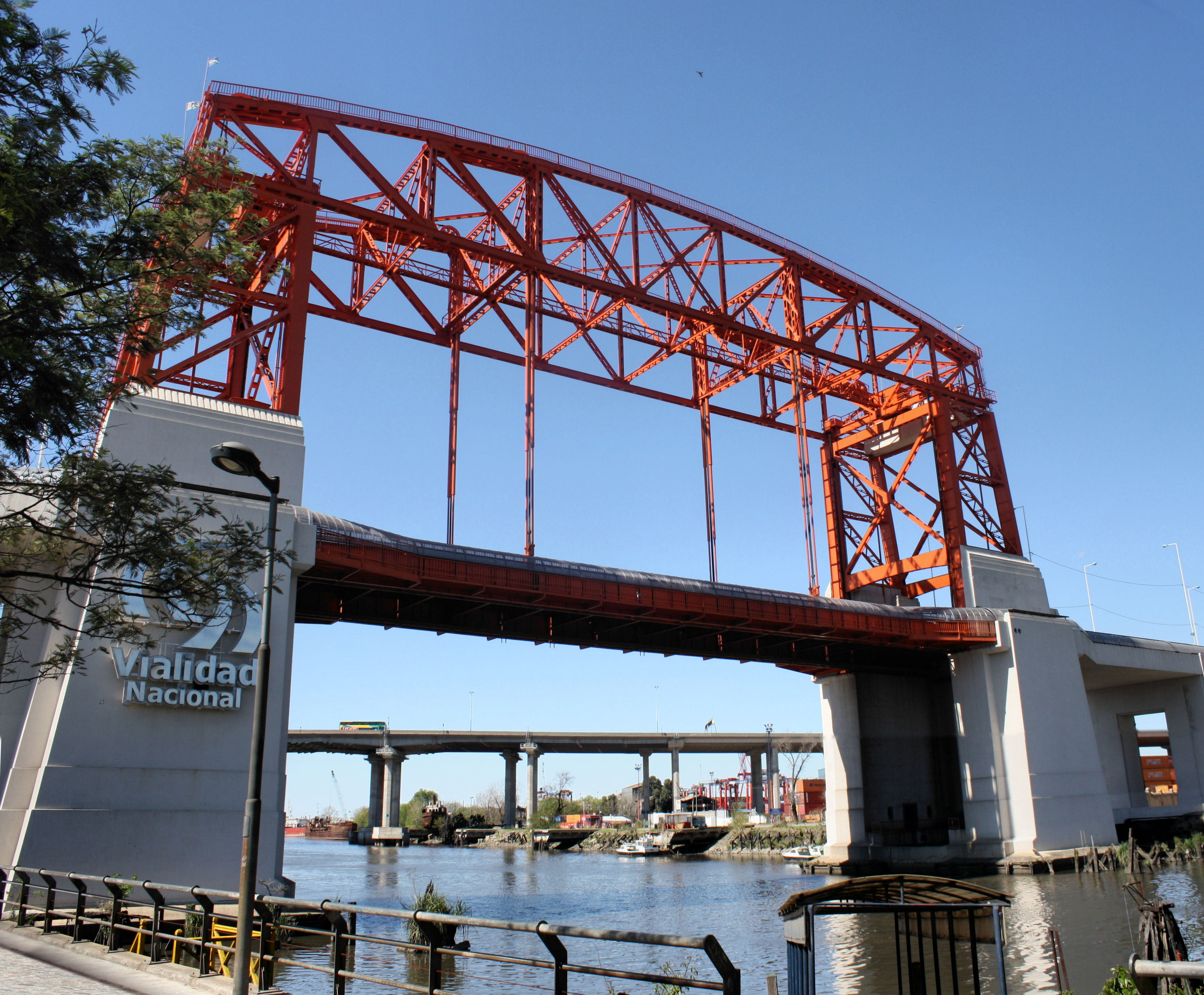
Puente Nicolás Avellaneda

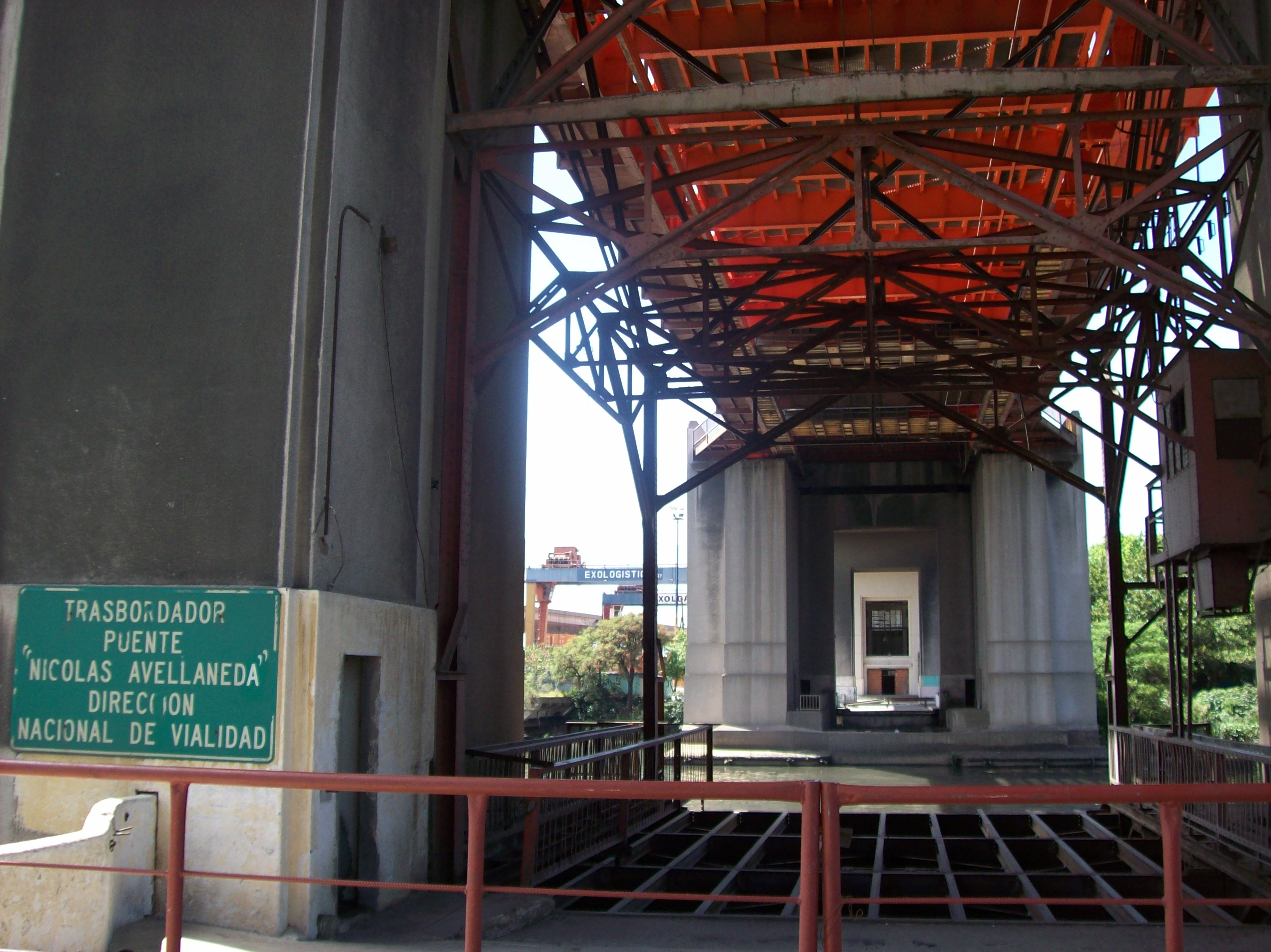
The gondola of the transporter bridge device of Puente Nicolás Avellaneda in its parking position

Puente Nicolás Avellaneda is a 1650-metre-long liftable road bridge with two lanes in Buenos Aires, Argentina over Riachuelo River, which was built from 1937 to 1940. The 57-metre-tall (187 ft) liftable section over the river has a length of 60 metres and offers a clearance of 43 metres when lifted, and a clearance of 21 metres when not lifted. This section of the bridge carries a transporter gondola and can work like the nearby Puente Transbordador as a transporter bridge. The transporter gondola was designed to allow horse-driven wagons to cross the river without using the long strenuous way over the ramps of the bridge. Puente Nicolás Avellaneda is the only liftable bridge in the world equipped with a transporter gondola. However since 1960, this gondola is only in use when the roadway on the bridge is closed for maintenance work.
