= Grupo Arcor =

Argentine food company

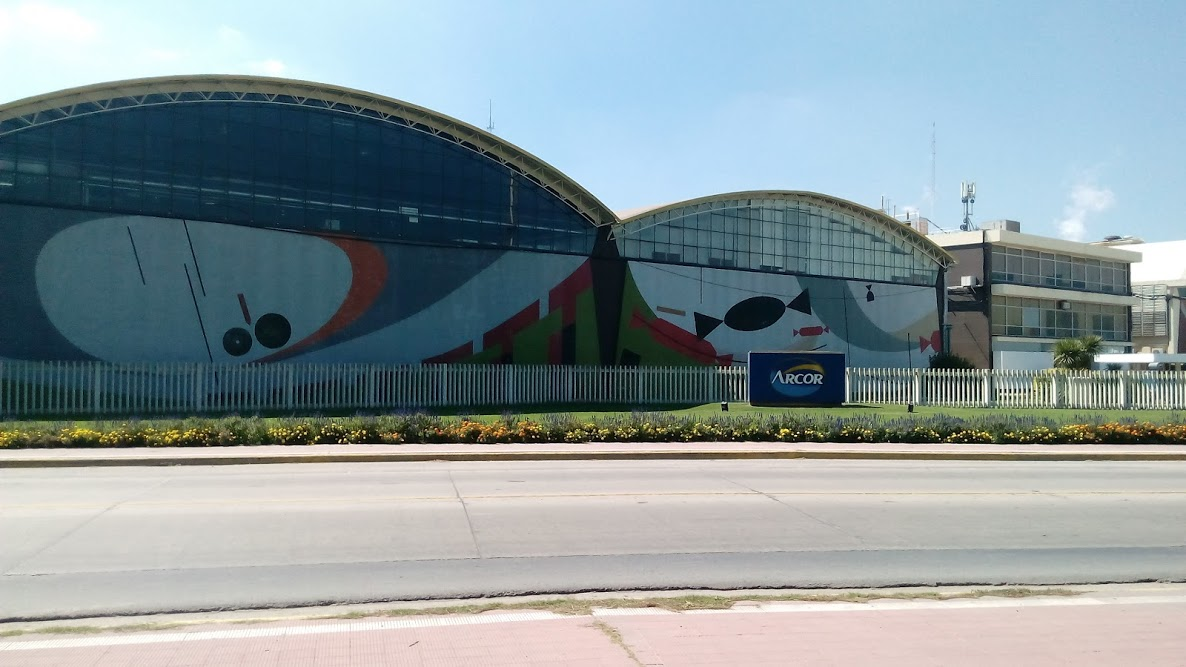
- Arcor main plant in Arroyito
- Company type: Public (S.A.I.C.)
- Founded: 5 July 1951; 74 years ago
- Founder: Fulvio Pagani
- Headquarters: Arroyito, Córdoba, Argentina
- Area served: Worldwide
- Key people: Luis Pagani (Chairman & CEO)
- Products: Confection
- Brands: Chocolate Aguila; Bagley
- Revenue: 3.2 billion USD (2015)
- Operating income: 6,549,300,000 Argentine convertible peso (2019)
- Number of employees: 19,700 (2019)
- Subsidiaries: Mastellone Hnos.
- Website: arcor.com

Grupo Arcor is an Argentine food company specializing in confectioneries. The firm was founded on July 5, 1951 in the city of Arroyito, Córdoba. It specializes in the production of foodstuff, sugar and chocolate confectioneries, cookies and ice cream in 39 industrial plants throughout Latin America. It is the world's top producer of hard candies and the tenth-biggest confectionery manufacturer overall. In Argentina, Arcor is the largest producer of processed foods, and its products are exported to over 120 countries.

In 2012, Arcor ranked 1st amongst the 100 most valuable companies of Argentina, according to the opinion of CEOs, financial analysts and journalists specializing in economics.

== History ==
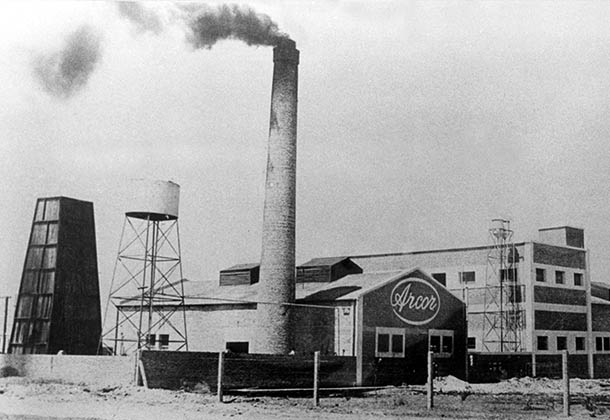
The first Arcor plant in Arroyito, Córdoba, 1958

Arcor was created on 5 July 1951 when a group of entrepreneurs, sons of Italian immigrants, opened the first candy factory in Arroyito, a city in Córdoba Province. The partners and buyers of the 10,000 m2 factory were members of the Pagani Family: Amos, Renzo, Fulvio, and Elio, who decided to call the recently formed company Arcor, a name made from the combination of the first two letters of the word "Arroyito" and the first three of "Córdoba". Apart from the Pagani family members, there were other partners that totalised 23 shareholders.

Arcor first exported its products to the United States in 1968. The company sent milk candy that were carried with no refrigeration. As a result, the merchandise arrived in the U.S. totally melted. Arcor compensated their North American partners covering all costs.

In 1958, Arcor reached 60,000 kg of daily confectionery production and started producing different product lines. Arcor continued its expansion throughout South America by opening in 1995 a large candy manufacturing plant in Peru.

In order to consolidate its position in the market, in 1993 Arcor bought "Chocolates Águila", a traditional chocolate manufacturer of Argentina established in 1880 by Abel Saint and mostly known for its chocolate bars. Arcor expanded the Aguila brand adding several products (such as ice creams, alfajores, and even candies) to its line. Between the 1930s and the 1970s, the former Chocolate Aguila company developed a huge variety of products, manufacturing and commercialising more than 100 different items in its factory located in Barracas.

Arcor acquired "Noel & Cia. Ltda. S.A.", a traditional company founded in 1847 by Spanish immigrant Carlos Noel, which had a reputation for its jellies and chocolate, in 1994.

Four years later, Arcor acquired "Lía", a cookie manufacturer and inaugurated the Arcor Museum in Arroyito. One year later, Arcor Group acquired "Dos en Uno", a Chilean leading company of sugar and chocolate confectionery, with a strong presence in the region.

By 2003, Arcor had incomes for US$800 million and had 13,000 employees (9,000 in Argentina). In 2004, Arcor associated with French conglomerate Danone to take over Bagley, a local producer of crackers and other cookies. Bagley had been acquired by Danone in 1994. With this partnership, Arcor–Danone became the largest cookies manufacturer in South America, with a turnover of US$300 million. Arcor owned 51% of Bagley, and Danone 49%. This alliance was only for the cookies market, with both companies carrying on the rest of their business separately.

The political and economic crises which the large Argentine agro-industrial companies suffered by the end of 2001, hit Arcor badly. Arcor was able to restructure its debt on December 1, 2008 with up to 5-year financing. Nevertheless, during those years Arcor acquired Benvenuto SACI, the company that owned La Campagnola brand, for US$40 million in 2005. Through this acquisition, Arcor incorporated some of La Campagnola canned products such as tuna, tomatoes, peas, and dips. At the moment of the purchase, Benvenuto employed 2,000 people that became part of the Arcor staff. Arcor totalised a total of 14,000 employees in Argentina by then.

Arcor Group settled in Europe in 2002 through the opening of commercial offices in Barcelona, Spain.

== Brands and products ==
As of August 2021 Arcor Group Foodstuff Division participates in more than 12 categories, including: jams and marmalades, fruit paste, sauces and canned tomatoes, tomato purees, canned vegetables, canned fish, beverages, mixes, polenta, dressings, oils and fruits, among others.

The following is a list containing the brands and its products, manufactured and/or commercialized by Arcor:

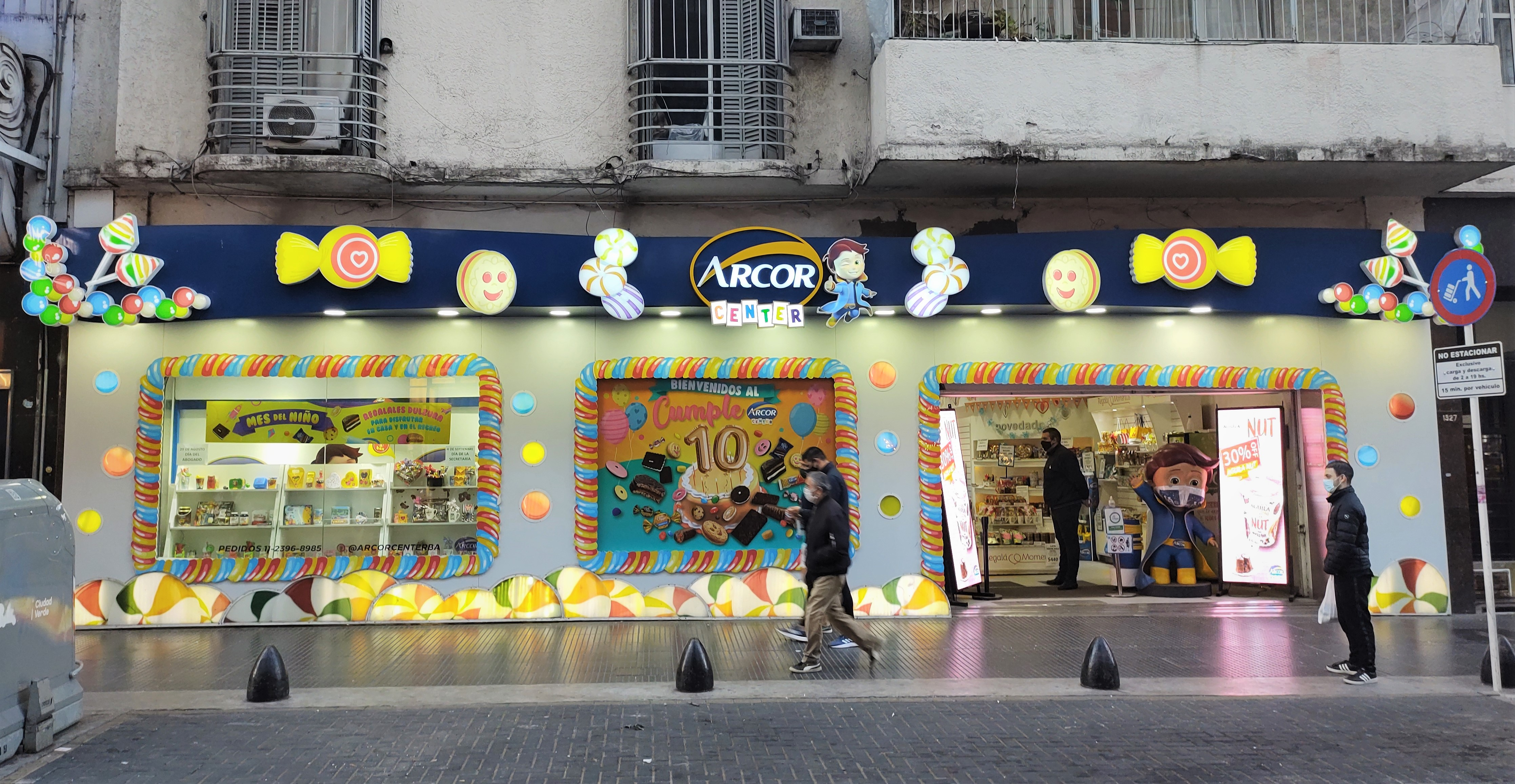
Arcor store on Avenida Corrientes in Buenos Aires

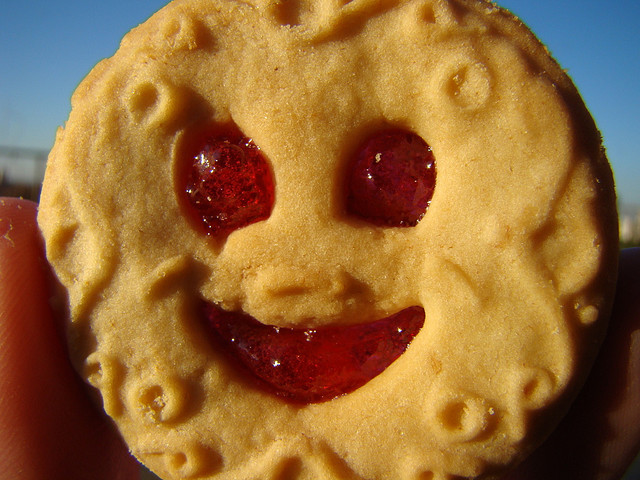
Sonrisas cookie, with its characteristic smilling face

Brand	Products
Arcor	Marmalade, chocolate powder, candy, canned food (vetch), ice cream, powdered juices, chocolate bar, fruit juice, wafer, turrón, ñoqui, cereal bar, crackers
Aguila	Chocolate bar, mint-filled bonbon, chocolate syrup, alfajor, ice cream, sponge cake, wafer
Bon-o-Bon	Alfajor, bonbon, wafer, ice cream, peanut paste
Butter Toffees	Candies
Cereal Mix	Granola bars, biscuits, crackers
Chocolinas (Note: Brand owned by Bagley Argentina S.A.)	Chocolate cookies
Cofler	Alfajor, bonbon, chocolate bar, wafer, ice cream, chocolate chip cookie
Criollitas	Crackers
Formis	Cookies
Godet	Bizcochuelo, gelatin dessert, flan, dessert
Hogareñas	Crackers
La Campagnola	Canned food (pears, corn, tuna, tomatoes), ketchup, marmalade, condiment
Menthoplus	Candies
Mister Pop's	Lollipops, ice creams
Mogul	Gumdrop, ice cream, jelly dessert
Natural Break	Cereal snacks
Poosh	Bubble gum
Presto Pronta	Polenta
Rocklets	Smarties, ice creams
Rumba	Cookies
Saladix	Snacks
Salsati	Tomato sauce, tomato purée
Sonrisas	Cookies
Tofi (Note: Originally a brand of Aguila launched in the 1980s.)	Chocolate bars, bonbon, alfajor, ice cream
Topline	Bubble gum
Tortuguita	Chocolate bars

== See also ==
- La Serenísima (subsidiary)
- Melville Sewell Bagley
