= Grido Helado =

Argentinian ice cream parlor chain

Helacor S.A.
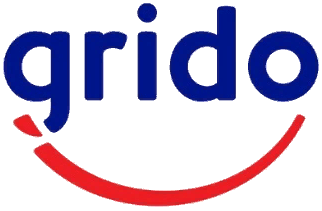

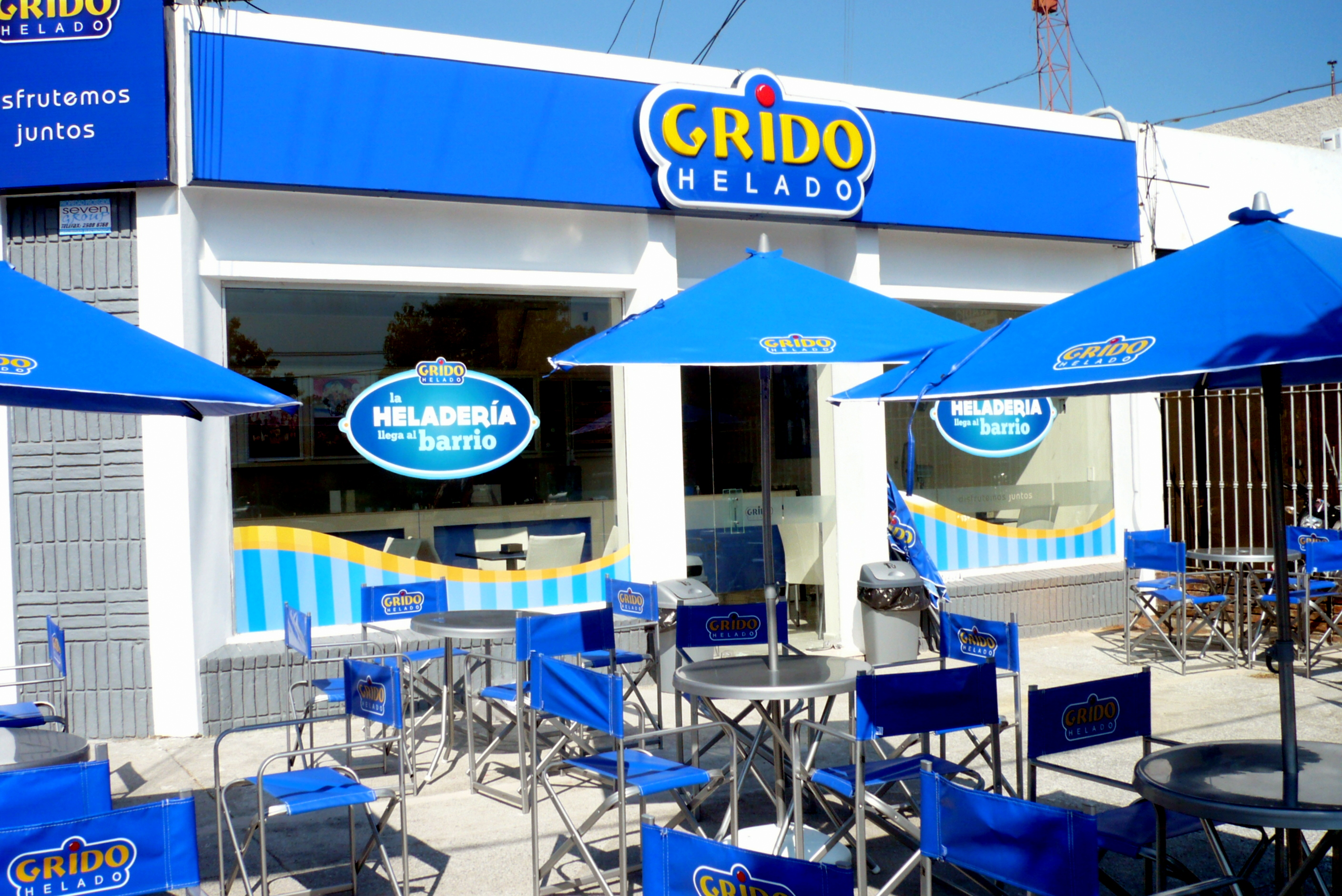
- A Grido ice cream parlor in Uruguay
- Trade name: Grido Helado
- Type: Private
- Industry: Food; Dairy
- Founded: 2000; 26 years ago
- Founder: Oscar Santiago and sons
- Headquarters: Ferreyra, Córdoba, Argentina
- Area served: Argentina, Uruguay, Chile, Paraguay, Peru
- Key people: Sebastián Santiago (Director), Celeste Santiago, Gonzalo Santiago, Lucas Santiago
- Products: Ice cream, gelato, pizza, desserts
- Owner: Santiago Family
- Website: argentina.gridohelado.com

Helacor S.A. (mostly known for its trade name Grido Helado) is a chain of ice cream parlors established and based in Argentina. It was founded by Oscar Santiago and his sons, opening its first store in the city of Córdoba, Argentina, in 2000.

As of January 2022, it has 1,900 parlor franchises distributed in Argentina, Uruguay, Paraguay, Chile, and Peru, with plans to expand to Brazil, Bolivia, and China. Grido produces 82 million kilos per year, being the largest ice cream chain not only in Argentina but in South America.

== History ==
The roots of the company can be traced to the 1920s, when Lucas Santiago sold ice creams under the name Laponia, a popular ice cream brand manufactured by Chocolate Aguila. Years later, Santiago founded "Marvic", their first own ice cream company, with an ice cream parlor in Córdoba city. Using their previous experience, the Santiago family founded Grido in 2000 as a franchise based business. The name "Grido" is the Italian translation of "scream". Their first option for the name had been "Criko" but it was changed after the founders realised it was already registered by Nestlé.

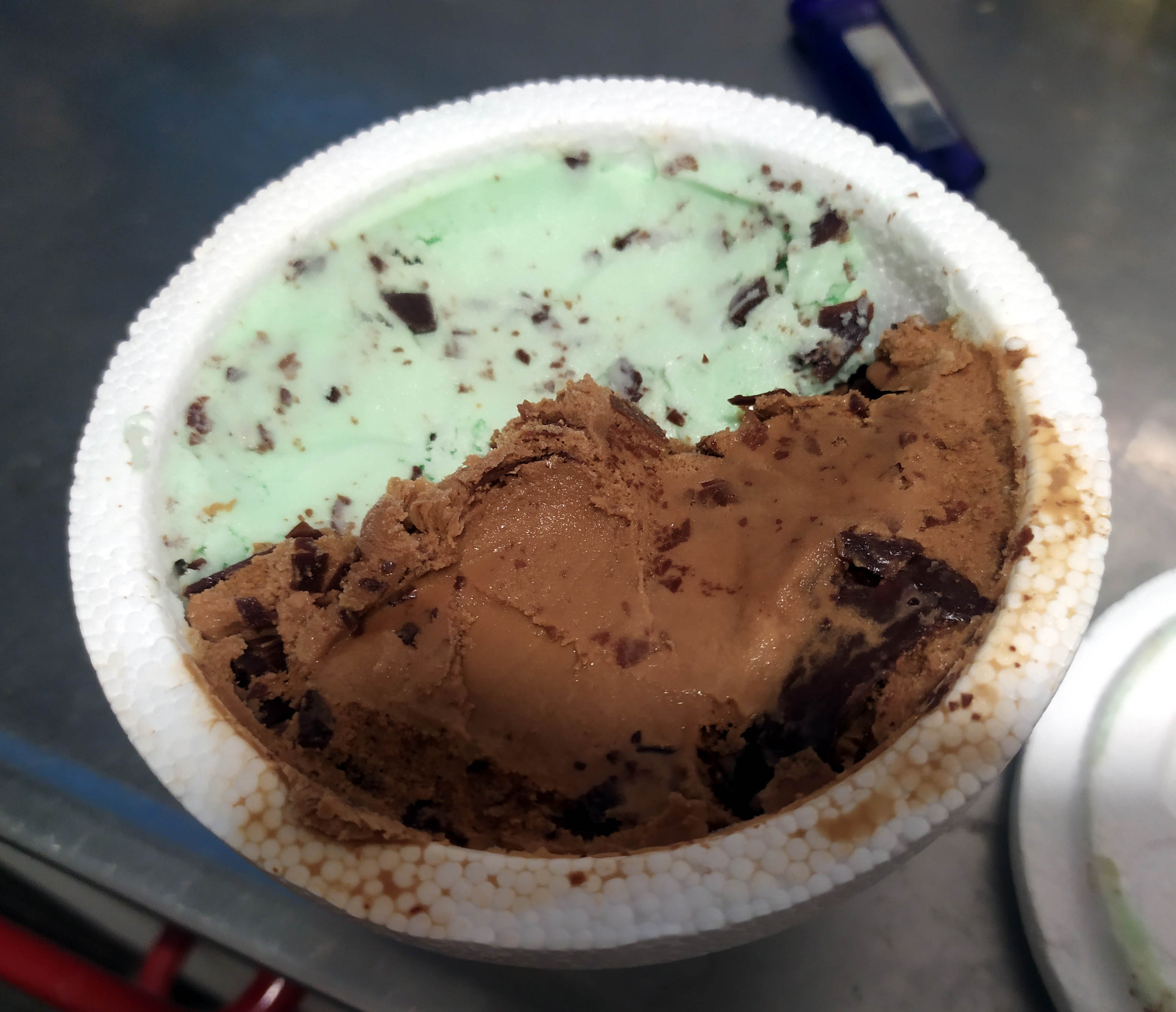
A pot of Grido ice cream

The same year of its foundation, Grido had expanded to 10 parlors, increasing to 50 stores a year later, all of them in Córdoba city. Within ten years, Grido had more than 900 franchises, and the increasing demand forced the company to move its production to a larger plant in the city of Ferreyra, Córdoba. Store expansion included nearby countries including Uruguay and Chile.

With the opening of a parlor in Ushuaia in Tierra del Fuego Province, Grido Helado became the first company to have stores in every Argentinian province.

Since its inception, Grido focussed on offering ice cream at low prices, stating that before their founding in 2000, ice cream were too expensive in Argentina.

Grido's expansion into international markets started in 2006 when they began operations in Chile. In September 2011, Grido started operations in Uruguay, opening five parlors in the country. The company was a major ice cream parlor chain in Latin America by that point, with a net income of $US35 million. The franchise expanded into Peru in 2022.
