= Bagley (company) =

Argentine food company

Bagley Argentina S.A.
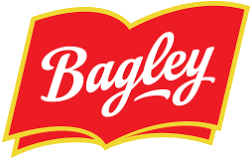
- Formerly: M.S. Bagley & Cía.
- Company type: S.A.
- Industry: Food
- Founded: 1864; 162 years ago
- Founder: Melville Sewell Bagley
- Fate: Acquired by Danone in 1994
- Headquarters: Buenos Aires, Argentina
- Products: Biscuits, alfajor
- Brands: Hesperidina (1864–2004)
- Owner: Grupo Arcor (51%); Danone (49%)
- Subsidiaries: Mastellone Hnos. (43%) (Note: Co-owned with Grupo Arcor.)
- Website: bagley.com.ar

Bagley Argentina S.A. is an Argentine food company with its main plant located in Buenos Aires. Established by U.S.-born entrepreneur Melville Sewell Bagley in 1864, the company (owned by French multinational Danone since 1994) had a wide variety of brands, having specialised in the production of crackers and cookies.

At the moment of being acquired by Danone, Bagley was the main cookies producer of Argentina. Nowadays, some of Bagley's brands (like Chocolinas, Rumba and Criollitas) are also marketed by Arcor, which is associated with Danone for cookies production in Argentina.

== History ==
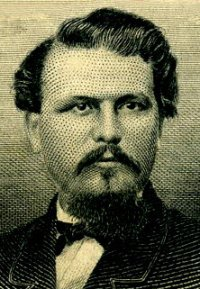
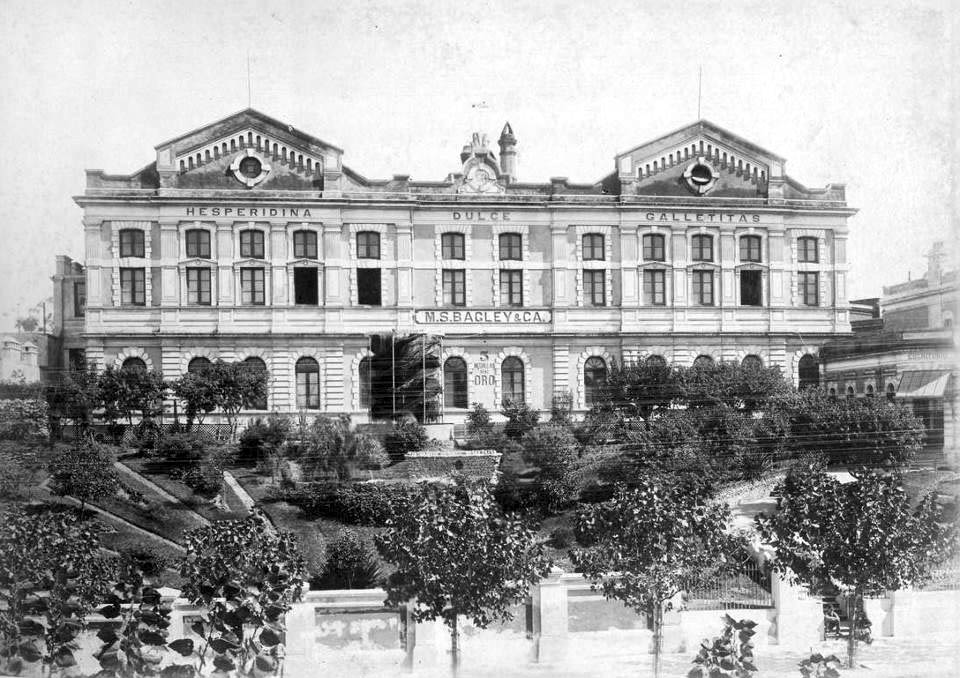
(Left): Melville Sewell Bagley founded the company in 1864 with the launch of Hesperidina, an aperitif; (right): Bagley's factory in Barracas, Buenos Aires (c. 1890)

The company was established in Buenos Aires in 1864 by American entrepreneur Melville Sewell Bagley, when the company launched famous apéritif Hesperidina. Bagley had been involved in the dry goods business in New Orleans before the outbreak of the American Civil War. After the outbreak he emigrated to Buenos Aires where he experimented with different formulas to create a digestive beverage using oranges as the main ingredient. Hesperidina would be born from those tests.

Nevertheless, it was not until 1875 when Bagley entered to the food market. That year, the company started producing biscuits after the Government of Argentina exempted the company from the custom duties so they could import the necessary machinery to produce food. Until then, cookies and biscuits were imported from the United Kingdom. The first biscuit produced was named Lola and became an immediate success. The biscuit was also used in hospitals as a food for patients.

In July 1880, Bagley died at the age of 42. His wife Mary Hamilton took over the business, while other partners were in charge of administration duties. In 1901, the company became a sociedad anónima and continued investing in machinery and opening new plants. Merchandise was delivered by horse-drawn carts. One year later, the company launched Mitre cookies, named after former president of Argentina Bartolomé Mitre that became popular, then launching Variedad, Tertulia, and Soda.

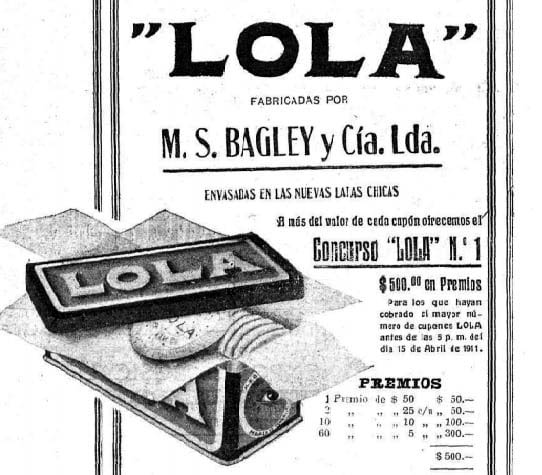
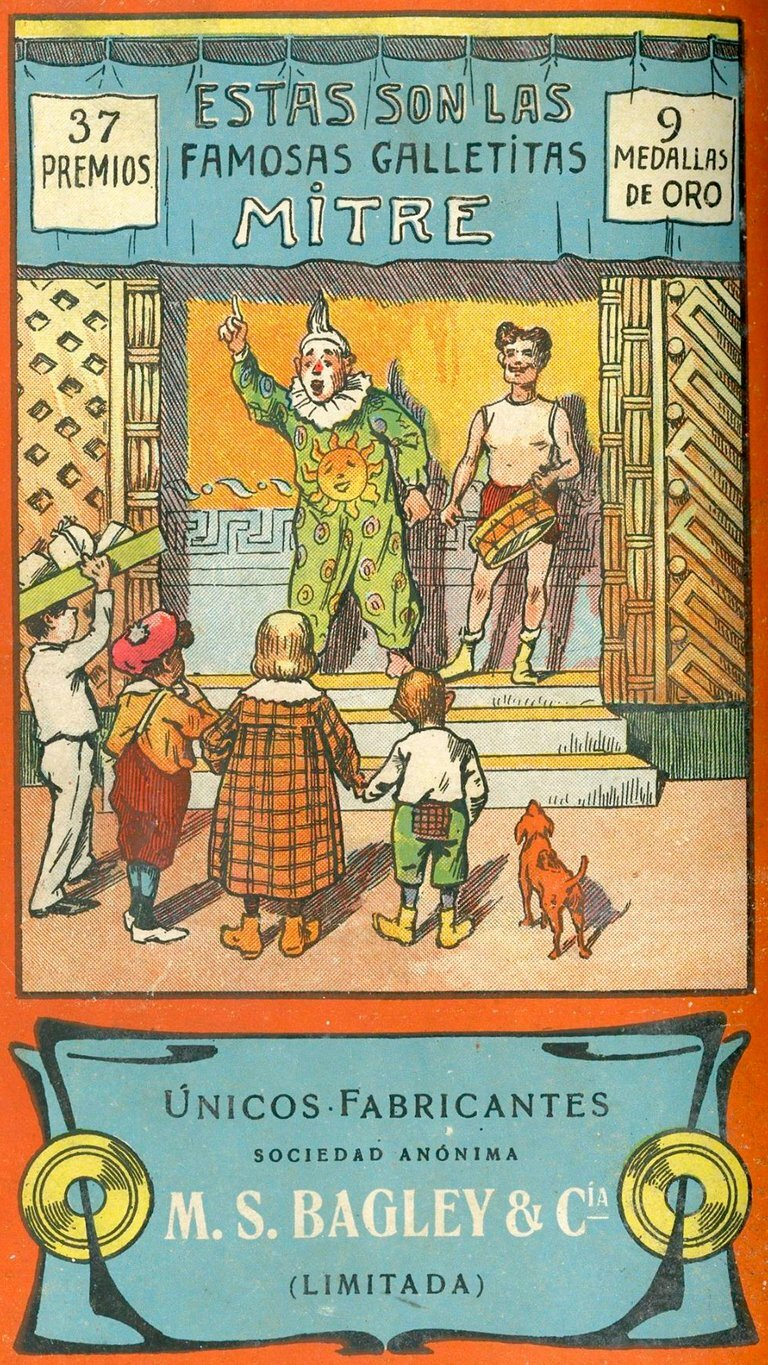
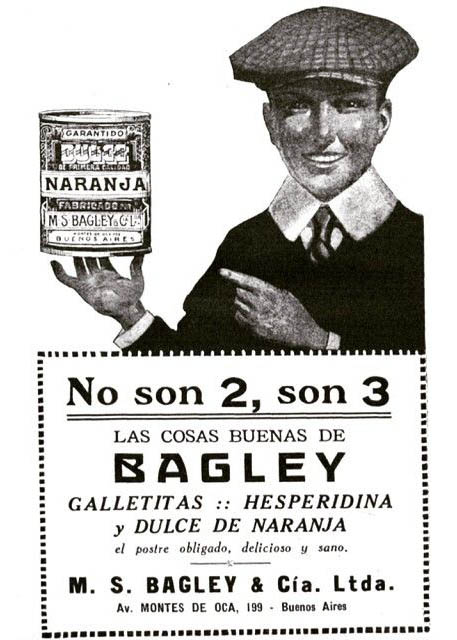
Three Bagley advertisements, (Left): "Lola" biscuits, c. 1900; (middle): "Mitre" biscuits, 1920; (right): Bagley advertisement of 1920, "the good things", referring to its cookies, marmalades and Hesperidina apéritif

Bagley was the first Argentine company to produce wafers in Argentina. They were Opera in 1908, following the reopening of Teatro Colón on May 25, when the four-act opera Aida was performed for the occasion. Starting in 1924, Bagley added other food products such as preserved goods, vinegar and the Jelina desserts. Moreover, their employees had benefits such as medical coverage and paid vacation before they were ruled by Law.

Launched in 1943, Criollitas cracker became an immediate success. That same year, Bagley started to package its products. Until then, biscuits were sold individually, being stored in tins and the stores commercialised them that way. Other products added were canned dulce de membrillo and dulce de batata.

The company expanded its products range introducing filled biscuit such as Merengadas, Sonrisas, Mellizas, Amor, Rumba, and crackers Rex, in the 1960s. Rumba soon became leader of chocolate-flavored biscuits. In 1975, the company launched Chocolinas, another chocolate-flavored biscuit which became not only a success but a historic landmark for the brand.

During the 1980, Bagley added more varieties to its biscuits range, launching Porteñitas (in 1980), and Tentaciones (a premium product with flavored jelly) in 1985.

In 1994, Bagley Argentina was acquired by French conglomerate Danone. Five years later, the group increased its ownership of the business to 91%.

By 2003, Arcor had incomes for US$800 million and had 13,000 employees (9,000 in Argentina). In 2004, Arcor associated with French conglomerate Danone to take over Bagley, a local producer of crackers and other cookies. Bagley had been acquired by Danone in 1994. With this partnership, Arcor–Danone became the largest cookies manufacturer in South America, with a turnover of US$300 million. Arcor owned 51% of Bagley, and Danone 49%. This alliance was only for the cookies market, with both companies carrying on the rest of their business separately. Both companies joined forces to sell cookies in Argentina, Brasil and Chile, with an estimated production of 385,000 tons of cookies per year.

Also in 2004, Bagley sold the rights to the Hesperidina brand to "Tres Blasones", which took over production of the apéritif until 2018, when it was acquired by another local company, "Grupo Cepas S.A.". It has been producing the beverage since then.

When Kraft Foods acquired most of Danone biscuits division in 2007, Danone retained its shareholding in Bagley.

In 2019, Bagley (along with Grupo Arcor) became owners of 43% of Mastellone Hermanos, the main dairy company of Argentina, after both firms acquired 2,310,000 shares to increase their part in the business.

== Products and brands ==
The company is mostly known for its wide variety of cookies and crackers, with some renowned brands such as Criollitas, Rumba, Opera, Sonrisas, and Chocolinas among others.

As of August 2021 current line of products include:

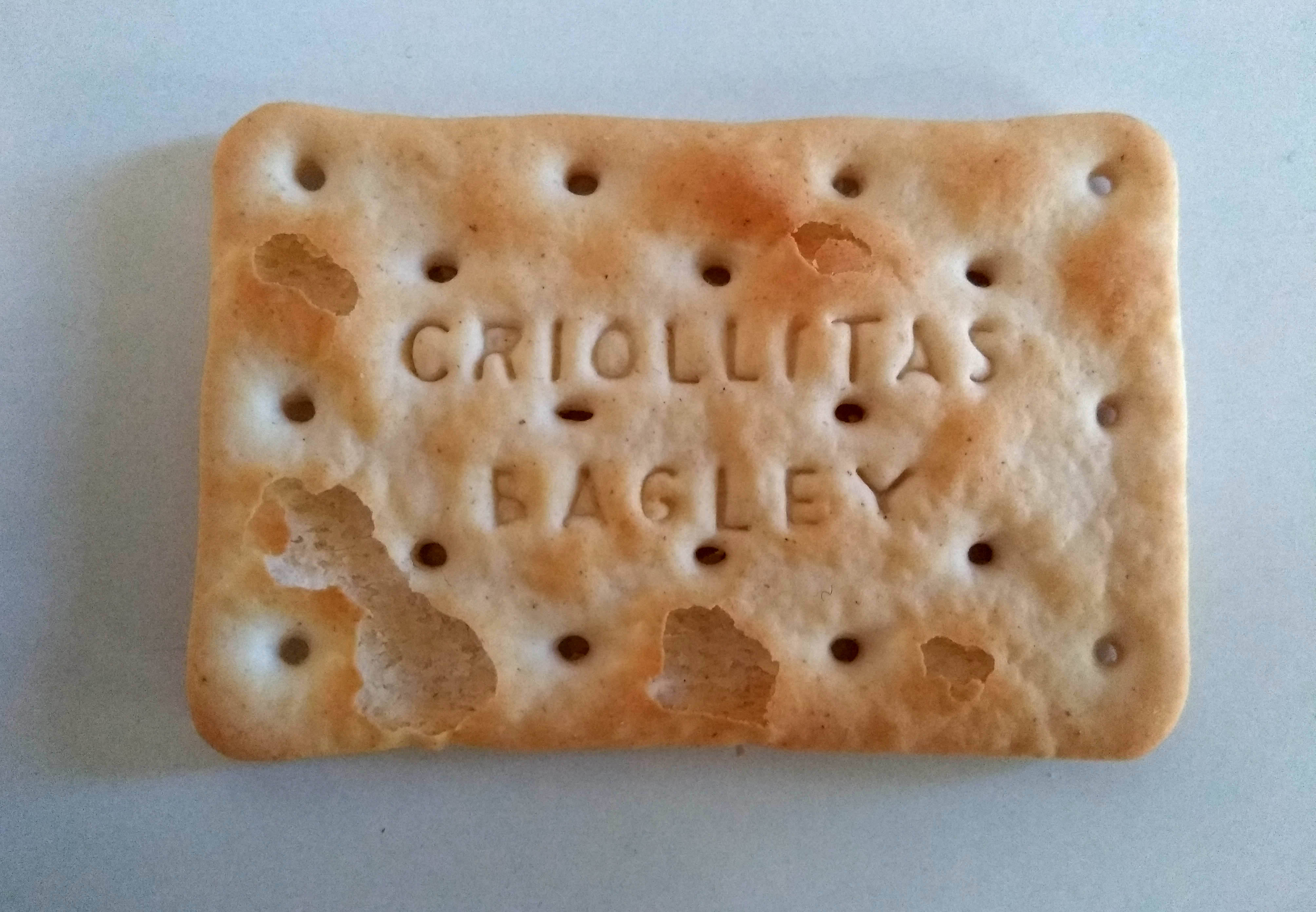
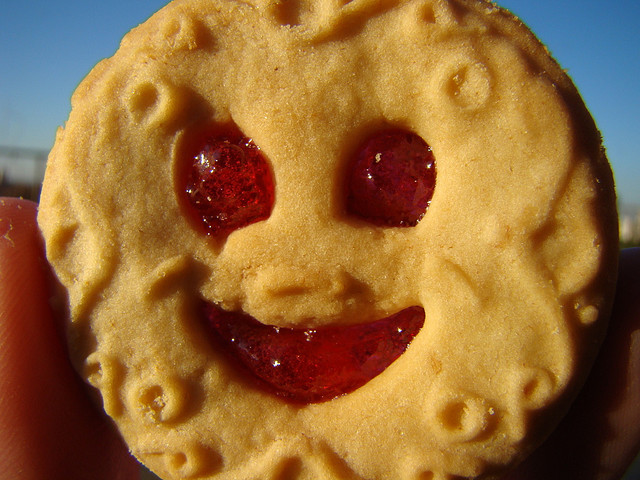
"Criollitas" cracker (left) and "Sonrisas" sandwich cookie, two of Bagley's most known products

Brand	Type
Amor	Vanilla-flavored biscuit filled with cream
Blanco y Negro	Alfajor
Chocolinas	Chocolate-flavored biscuit
Kesitas	Snack
Mellizas	Vanilla-flavored biscuit filled with lemon paste
Merengadas	Vanilla-flavored biscuit filled with strawberry paste
Opera	Wafer
Rex	Snack
Rumba	Chocolate-flavored biscuit filled with cream
Traviata	Cracker

== In popular culture ==
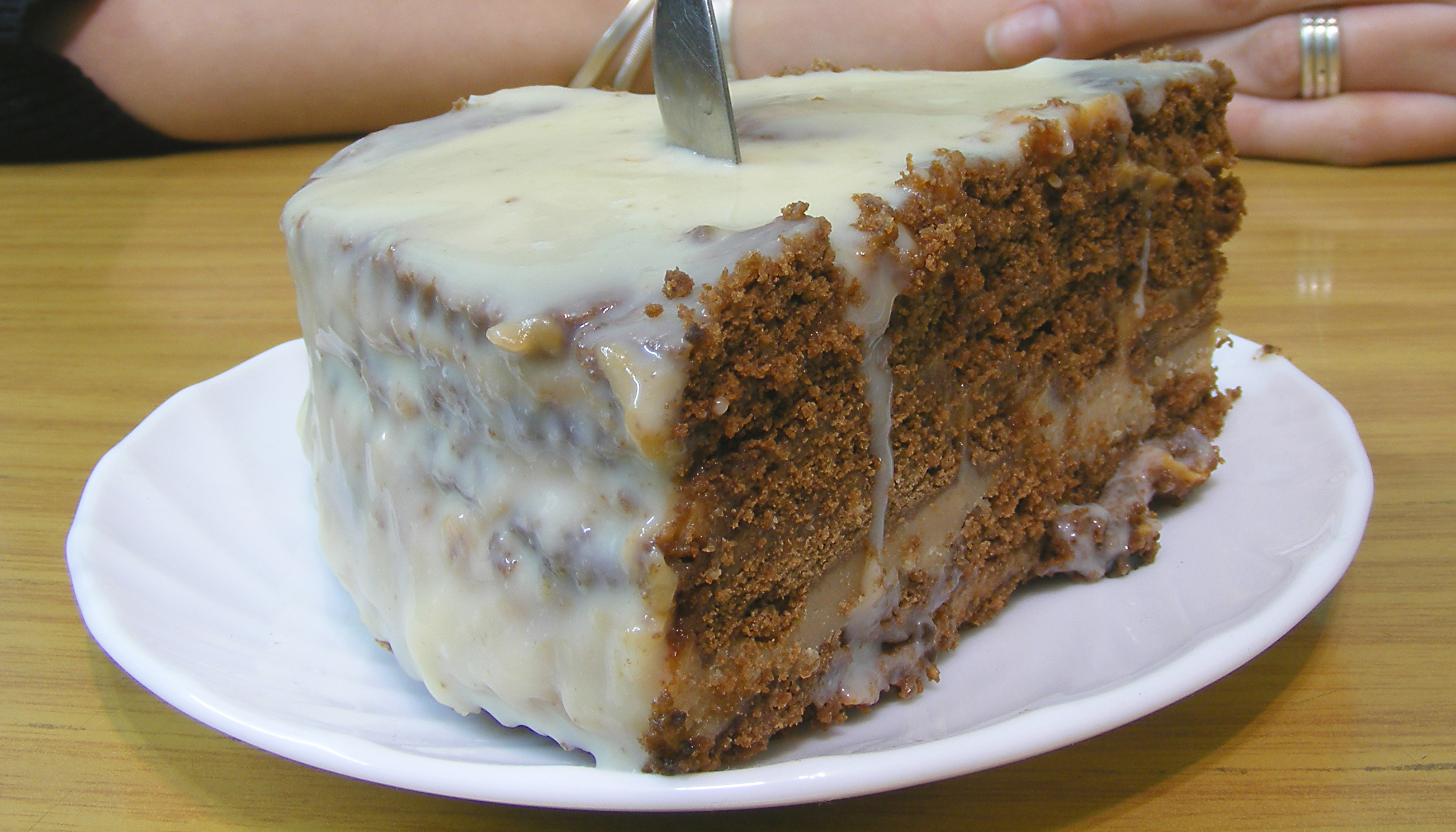
An example of the popular chocotorta

The chocotorta (a local chocolate cake) uses Chocolinas cookies as its main ingredient. It was invented in 1982 by Marité Mabragaña, an Argentinian advertising creative while coming up with a dessert for her two young sons. As she also worked for two dairy companies, she mixed dulce de leche with cream cheese to use as filling. It also includes chocolate cookies.

The chocotorta had a TV advertising spot (featuring two products from different companies, Mendicrim, a cream cheese brand marketed by Osvaldo Mendizábal, and Bagley's Chocolinas) and soon became a success. That success led Bagley to include the cake recipe on Chocolinas packages. In 2020, the chocotorta was named "the best dessert in the world" by the website TasteAtlas in a survey of restaurant critics.

In 1973, guerrilla organisation Montoneros assassinated union leader José Ignacio Rucci. The attack was named Operación Traviata in reference to advertisements which promoted the Bagley's cracker as "the 23-hole cracker". Rucci had been killed with 23 gunshots.

== See also ==
- Hesperidina
- Melville Sewell Bagley
