= Melville Sewell Bagley =

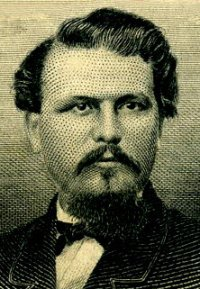
- Born: July 10, 1838; Bangor, Maine
- Died: July 14, 1880 (aged 42); Buenos Aires, Argentina
- Occupation: Entrepreneur
- Known for: Bagley (Argentine company) and Hesperidina liqueur
- Notable work: Hesperidina

Melville Sewell Bagley (July 10, 1838, near Bangor, Maine – July 14, 1880, in Buenos Aires, Argentina) was the originator of the archetypical Argentine national liqueur Hesperidina and holder of the first patent and trademark to be registered in Argentina on that product.

== Biography ==
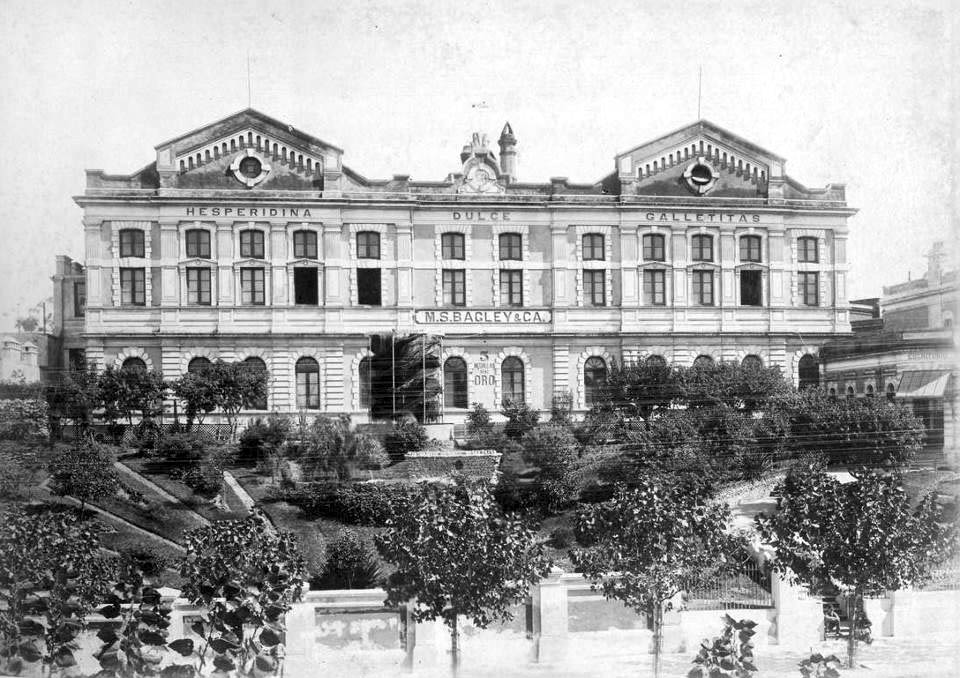
Bagley's factory in Barracas, Buenos Aires (c. 1890)

Bagley was an American businessman who lived most of his life in Argentina but was born in 1838 in the state of Maine. Members of the family lived in Durham, Maine, and Bangor, Maine. He migrated first to New Orleans, Louisiana, where he worked in a dry goods store. In 1861 with the outbreak of the American Civil War he immigrated to Buenos Aires, Argentina where he worked for a commission merchant. He sought to own his enterprise and he found an opportunity. Bitter oranges had been planted as a decorative tree and street vendors had found that they could be sold as a refreshment, but Argentines were concerned about disposal of the peel. Many vendors chose to sell on the block in front of the National Palace. A prize was offered for someone who could find a creative way to collect and use the peels.

Bagley collected a large quantity of the peels and through experimenting, created an aperitif and herbal flavored triple sec. He then took inspiration from recent American publicity techniques and put up posters with the legend "Hesperidina is Coming" ("Se viene Hesperidina") in prominent locations and in newspapers. A newspaper editor wrote a column speculating on the mysterious product. Bagley then arranged for a cart of his product Hesperidina to have a wheel come off in front of the newspaper headquarters.

The story of the cart and the product was picked up by the various newspapers and attracted significant attention in restaurants and saloons. It became a highly successful business which obtained the first patent and trademark. Hesperidina is considered the Argentine national liqueur. Bagley later started a biscuit company, Bagley Argentina S.A., which was more successful. Both products are still manufactured.

== See also ==
- Bagley (Argentine company)
