= Chocotorta =

No-bake dessert of Argentina

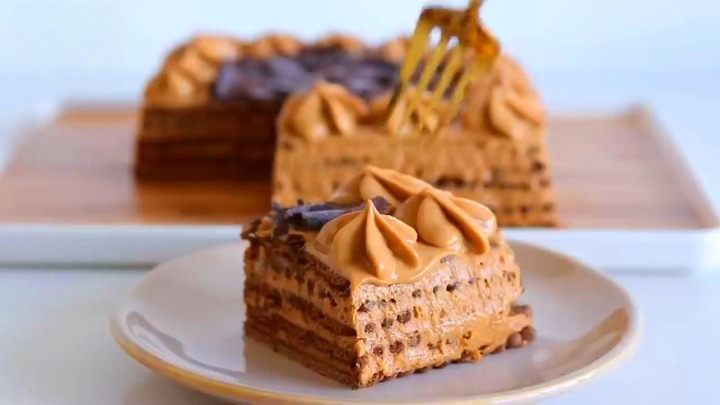
- Course: Dessert
- Place of origin: Argentina
- Created by: Marité Mabragaña
- Serving temperature: Cold
- Main ingredients: Chocolate biscuits soaked in milk or coffee, dulce de leche, cream cheese

Chocotorta (a portmanteau of "choco" for "chocolinas" and "torta", Spanish for "cake") is a typical no-bake dessert of Argentina that is made with chocolate biscuits or cookies—specifically the Chocolinas brand produced by Bagley—that are soaked with milk or coffee and layered with a mixture of dulce de leche and cream cheese.

== History ==
The creation of the recipe is attributed to the advertising creative Marité Mabragaña, who around 1982 devised a joint campaign between two brands: Bagley's Chocolinas cookies and Mendicrim cream cheese, then owned by the Mendizábal company. Due to the ease and practicality of its preparation, the chocotorta became a success and over the years has come to be described as Argentina's most popular dessert and a cultural icon of the country, especially associated with birthday celebrations. In 2020, TasteAtlas listed chocotorta as the best dessert in the world. Despite its ubiquity in Argentine culture, the chocotorta is also known for the rejection it has provoked in several well-known figures of the local gastronomy, who claim that the simple preparation should not be considered a cake nor a representative of national confectionery. There is also a coconut biscuit version made with another Bagley's brand, Coquitas, thus known as "coquitorta".

== See also ==
- List of Argentine sweets and desserts
