= 2024 Buenos Aires firebomb attack =

2024 killing of three lesbians in Argentina

Buenos Aires firebomb attack
- Location: Buenos Aires, Argentina
- Date: 6 May 2024; 01:00 (UTC−03:00)
- Attack type: Arson, bombing
- Weapon: Molotov cocktail
- Deaths: 3
- Injuries: 8
- Perpetrator: Juan Fernando Barrientos
- Motive: Lesbophobia

On 01:00 on 6 May 2024, a 62-year-old man threw a Molotov cocktail into a room at a boarding house in the Barracas neighbourhood of Buenos Aires, Argentina. The subsequent fire led to the deaths of three women, with the fourth suffering significant injuries. After it was revealed that the victims had been lesbians, human rights groups such as Amnesty International and the Federación Argentina de Lesbianas, Gays, Bisexuales y Trans called for it to be treated as a case of lesbicide and femicide. The case, which became referred to in local media as the Barracas massacre (Spanish: Masacre de Barracas), has been cited as an example of increasing rates of hate crimes in Argentina following the election of Javier Milei in 2023.

== Incident ==
Pamela Fabiana Cobas (aged 52), Mercedes Roxana Figueroa (also aged 52), Andrea Amarante (aged 42) and Sofía Castro Riglos (aged 49) all shared a room at a boarding house at 16000 Olavarría Street in the Barracas neighbourhood in southeastern Buenos Aires. All four women were lesbians, and Cobas and Figueroa were in a romantic relationship.

At around 01:00 on 6 May 2024, a Molotov cocktail was thrown into the women's bedroom on the first floor of the guesthouse by Justo Fernando Barrientos, a 62-year-old man originally from Tucumán Province, who had moved to Buenos Aires at the age of 26 and lived in the same guesthouse. The subsequent fire set the women's room alight. It was reported that Barrientos prevented the victims from accessing a shower to douse the flames, and that he physically assaulted at least one of the women. He then went to the roof of the building, where he attempted suicide.

Cobas died at the scene. The three other women were taken to local hospitals, where Figueroa died two days later of organ failure after experiencing burns to 90% of her body. Amarante died at Penna Hospital on 12 May after suffering burns to 75% of her body. Riglos ultimately survived the fire, but required months of hospitalisation at a burns unit after experiencing significant burns.

The fire spread throughout the guesthouse, prompting all its residents to be evacuated. Seven other people in the building were hospitalised for burns.

== Investigation ==
Local police arrested Barrientos at the scene on suspicion of murder and attempted murder; they did not initially announce a motive for the attack. Local media reported that Barrientos had previously threatened to kill Cobas and Figueroa, and that he regularly insulted the victims in the period leading up to the fire. Barrientos was placed into pre-trial detention at a prison in Ezeiza.

Barrientos' trial began in May 2026, two years after the attack, at Criminal and Correctional Court No. 5 in Buenos Aires, on charges of the murder of Cobas, Figueroa and Amarante, and the attempted murder of Miglos. The court initially refused to consider additional hate crime charges, though reversed this decision following public criticism from lawyers and activists, including the attorney general, Manuel Fernández Buzzi, the Mothers of Plaza de Mayo and the Cromañón Movement. The prosecution's closing arguments in October 2026 called for Barrientos to be given a life sentence for femicide and lesbicide. The defence's closing arguments are scheduled to take place in November 2026.

== Response ==
On 13 May 2024, over 200 protesters gathered in Buenos Aires, publicly stating that the women had been set on fire for being lesbians, and accusing the government of Javier Milei of promoting hate speech and fostering a "culture of intolerance". Following the fire, national and international human rights organisations alleged that homophobic comments made by prominent politicians, particularly during the previous year's elections, had contributed to an increase in violence against the LGBTQ community in Argentina. A report by Buenos Aires' LBGTQ ombudsman had concluded that Milei's presidential campaign had built "a climate of segregation, rejection and discrimination" and expressed concern that it would contribute to a "fertile ground for violence" against vulnerable groups. During the election, Milei had said that teaching children about sexuality and gender would lead to the "destruction" of the family, while in November 2023 Diana Mondino, whom Milei would subsequently appoint as Foreign Minister, compared same-sex marriage to having head lice. Following his successful election to President of Argentina, Milei abolished the Ministry of Women, Genders and Diversity.

Following the fire, a spokesperson for Milei described the attack as "terrible", but added that he "would not want to define it as an attack against a certain group". A group of lesbians subsequently formed the Self-Organised Lesbians for the Barracas Massacre (Spanish: Lesbianes Autoconvocades por la Masacre de Barracas), which called for the women's deaths to be legally recognised as being as a result of a hate crime. On 5 May 2025, it met at the Buenos Aires Legislature, where it led a panel on hate crimes and hate speech. The Argentine LGBT+ Federation stated it would offer support to the families of the women killed.

The human rights organisation Human Rights Watch called on Argentine authorities to conduct a "thorough and transparent" investigation into the women's killings, and to ensure medical care and housing for the surviving woman. It also stated that Argentine politicians should "cease and condemn" homophobic rhetoric. Amnesty International demanded a "full investigation" that considered the victims' identities as lesbians as a motivation for the attack.

On 6 May, to mark a year since the fire, a memorial event was held at Plaza Colombia.
