= Arroyito, Córdoba =

Arroyito
- City
- Nickname: Sweet City
- Location of Arroyito in Argentina Arroyito (Argentina)
- Coordinates: 31°25′S 63°3′W
- Country: Argentina
- Province: Córdoba
- Department: San Justo

Government
  - Intendant: Gustavo Ariel Benedetti

Area
  - Total: 20 km^{2} (7.7 sq mi)
- Elevation: 155.7 m (511 ft)

Population (2022 census)
  - Total: 28,007
  - Density: 1,400/km^{2} (3,600/sq mi)
- Demonym: arroyitense
- Time zone: UTC−3 (ART)
- CPA base: X2434
- Dialing code: +54 3576
- Website: www.municipioarroyito.gob.ar (in Spanish)

Arroyito (Spanish pronunciation: [aroˈʝito]) is a city in Córdoba Province, Argentina. It is located 115 km (71 mi) east of provincial capital, Córdoba, and lies on both sides of National Route 19. The city is nicknamed Ciudad Dulce ("Sweet City").

== Etymology ==
Arroyito can be translated as "little stream" or "little brook". The name derived from a stream, now disappeared, that flowed through the settlement and emptied into the Xanaes river. Early records referred to the area as paraje del Arroyito or El Arroyito.

== History ==
=== Early settlement ===
The Date of Arroyito's founding is unknown. The earliest known document that mentions the settlement is the first census of the Viceroyalty of the Río de la Plata, conducted on 23 November 1778, which recorded a population of 220. At that time, the settlement was known as Villa Arroyito. Spanish soldier José Ignacio Urquía later built a church dedicated to Our Lady of Mercy, which was completed in 1790.

According to the 1869 national census, Arroyito had 228 inhabitants.

== Economy ==
The first major economic activity in Arroyito was forest exploitation. Baldassare Dalle Mura and Raffaello Bianchi, both Italian immigrants from Tuscany, owned the two most important sawmills in the area. As the forest were cleaned, the area was converted to agriculture use. The Great Depression reduced the availability of raw materials for the sawmills, leading to their closure and causing emigration and economic decline.

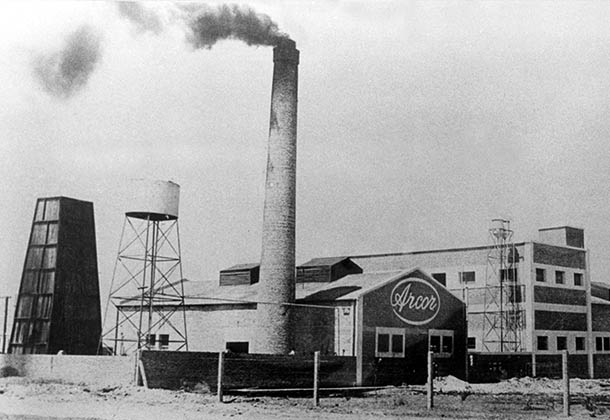
Front view of the first Arcor factory, in 1958.

In 1951, a group of young entrepreneurs led by Fulvio Salvador Pagani founded a candy manufacturing plant. The facility on 5 July 1951 and marked the establishment of company Arcor. The new industry generated significant demand for labor, contributing to population growth in Arroyito.

== Twin towns ==
- Verzuolo, Italy (2003)
