= Hesperidina =

Argentine apéritif

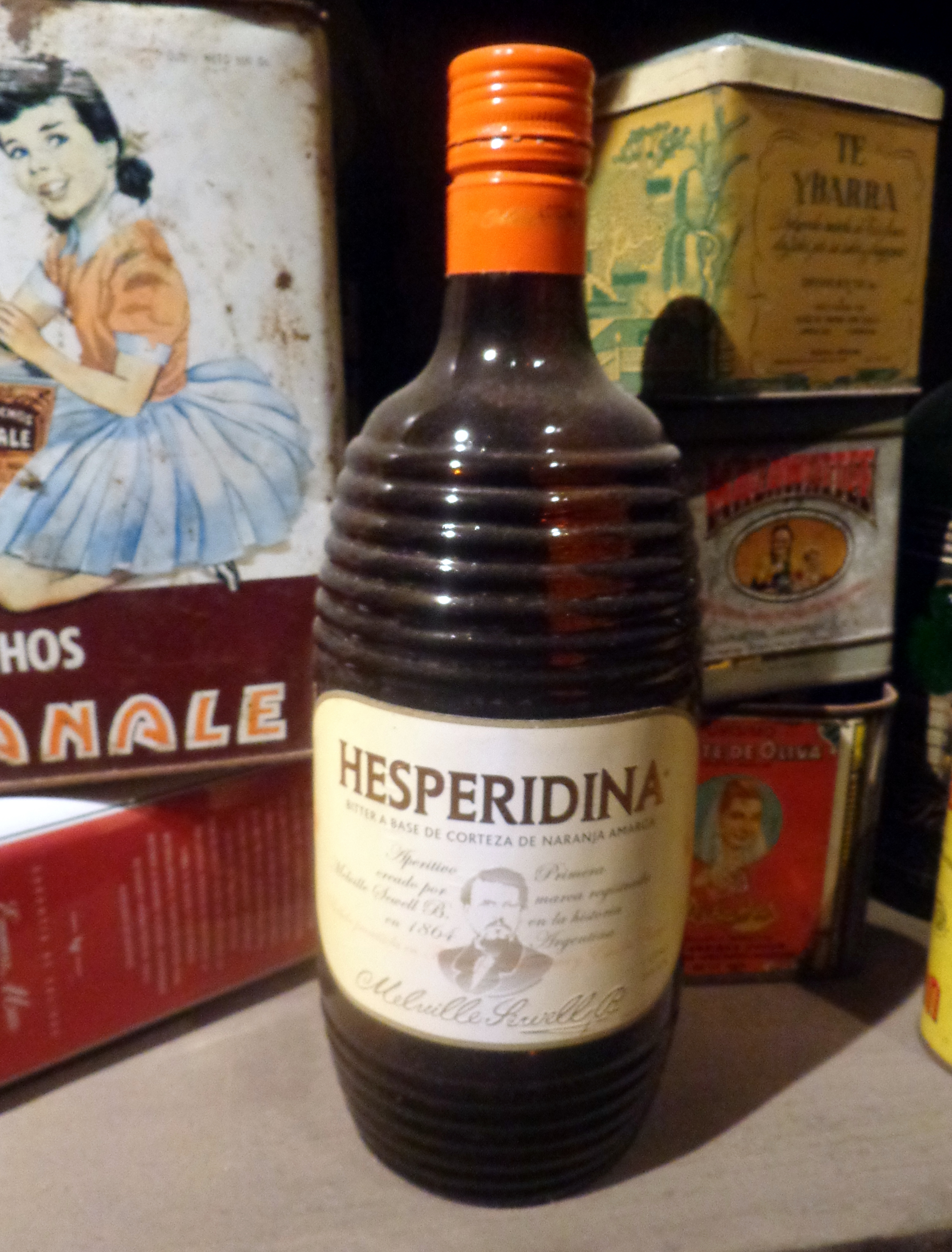
- Product type: Apéritif
- Current owner: Grupo Cepas (2018–pres.)
- Country: Argentina
- Introduced: 1864; 162 years ago
- Markets: Argentina
- Previous owners: Tres Blasones (2004–2018); Bagley (1864–2004)

Hesperidina is a classic Argentine apéritif made from bitter and sweet orange peels, which contain a high number of flavonoids. The beverage has antioxidant effects because of the flavonoids. Its name was taken from the Greek myth of Hesperides.

The Hesperidina was invented by Melville Sewell Bagley and manufactured by the company established by him, Bagley Argentina. Since Bagley ceased production of Hesperidina, the apéritif has been produced by other brands, such as Tres Blasones and more recently, Grupo Cepas, which acquired the brand in 2018.

== History ==
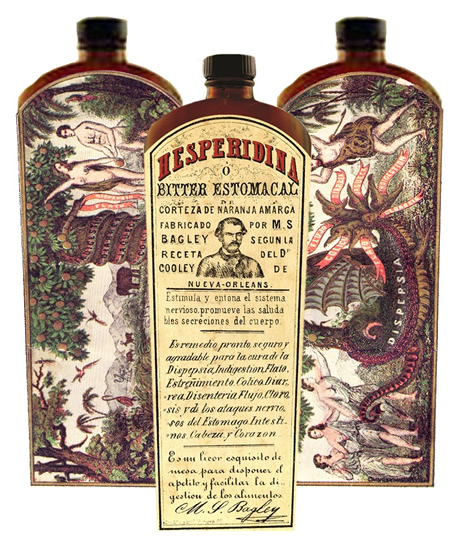
Anverse and reverse of the first Hesperidina bottles, c. 1864

This alcoholic drink was invented in 1864 by a United States immigrant, Melville Sewell Bagley, in Buenos Aires, Argentina. Bagley was a native of the state of Maine. He had been involved in the dry goods business in New Orleans before the outbreak of the American Civil War. After the outbreak he emigrated to Buenos Aires where he worked at "La Estrella" pharmacy, located on Defensa and Alsina streets. Bagley experimented with different formulas to create a digestive beverage using oranges as the main ingredient. Hesperidina would be born from those tests.

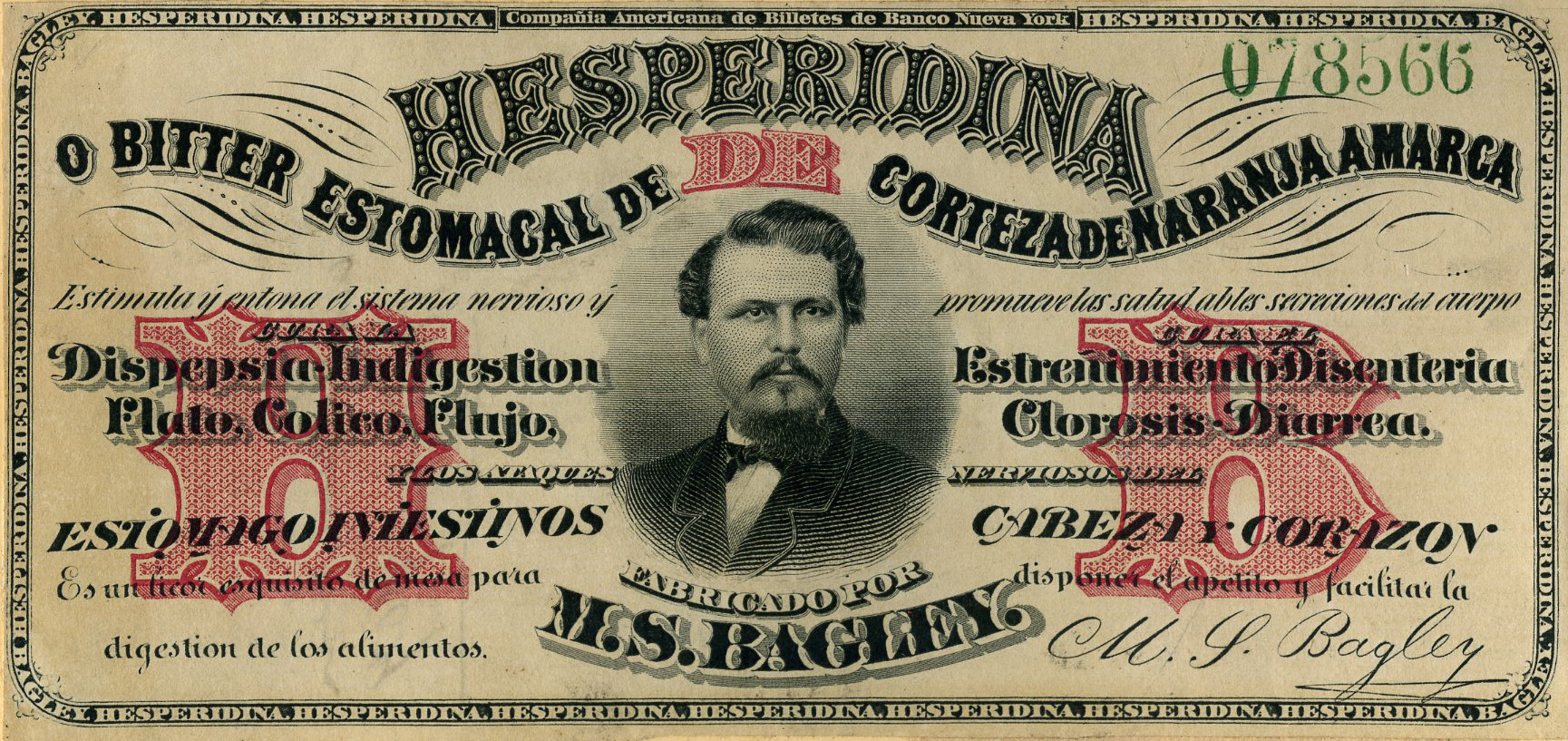
The Hesperidina label (1866) was printed in the US to avoid falsifications

Prior to the official launch of his drink, Bagley held an extensive publicity campaign using posters spread throughout Buenos Aires. Those posters had only the single, cryptic word "Hesperidina" without images or further explanations.

The poster campaign lasted three months until Hesperidina was finally launched on December 24, 1864, with an advertisement published in La Tribuna newspaper. The advertisement touted Hesperidina as a "stomach digestive, prepared with bitter oranges." The immediate success of the apéritif led to imitators and counterfeiting of the product. Alarmed by this development, Bagley convinced the president of Argentina, Nicolás Avellaneda, to create a patent and trademark office in 1876 in order to protect his product. Hesperidina was the first product to register as a trademark in Argentina on October 27. Soon after, Bagley had Hesperidina labels printed at the New York Bank Note Company in order to strengthen controls over the product.

During the Triple Alliance War (1864–1870) Hesperidina was distributed among Argentine soldiers "to revitalize the wounded" because of its therapeutic effects on stomach problems associated with drinking non-potable water.

Beverages helped create a new area of advertising, led by the Hesperidina campaign and the arrival in the country of international food and beverage brands such as Real Hollands, Nestlé, Domecq and Bols.

Hesperidina was produced by Bagley until 2004, when the company sold the brand to "Tres Blasones", which manufactured it until 2018, when "Grupo Cepas S.A." acquired rights to the brand.

== In popular culture ==
The Hesperidina is mentioned in three short stories by Julio Cortázar: Casa Tomada, Tía en Apuros and Circe. Another writer, Juan Carlos Casas, included Hesperidina in his book Fraile Muerto. Hesperidina also appeared in the short story Perdido by Haroldo Conti.

Tango singer Roberto Goyeneche described Hesperidina as one of his favorite beverages, which he used to drink at "La Sirena", a bar located on Balbín and Núñez streets in Saavedra, Buenos Aires. Hesperidina also appeared in several calendars painted by Gauchesco artist Florencio Molina Campos. Another famous person who adopted Hesperidina as his favorite drink was explorer Francisco Moreno, who used to drink it during his trips to the harsher regions of southern Argentina.

The French musician José de Wravrin, who performed under the name Juan Nirvassed, composed Hesperidina: Tango de Moda in 1915, which would later win first prize in a competition held in Sociedad Sportiva Argentina. Hesperidina is also mentioned in the film Juan Moreira, directed by Leonardo Favio in 1973.

== See also ==
- Apéritif and digestif
- History of alcohol
