= Chocolate Aguila =

Argentine brand of chocolate products

Saint Hermanos S.A.

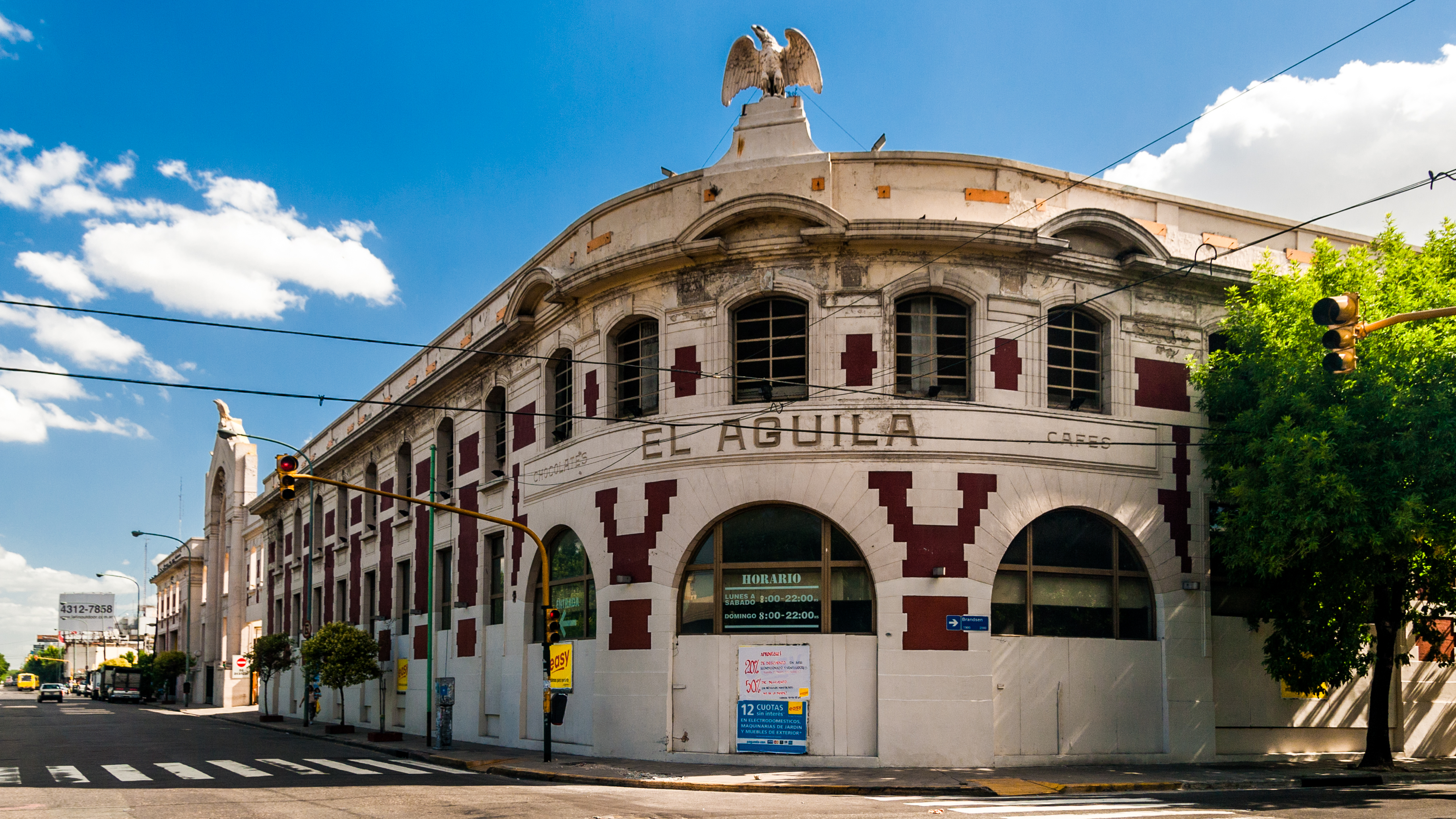
- Former Aguila factory in Barracas, 2007
- Company type: Private
- Industry: Food
- Founded: 1880 in Buenos Aires
- Founder: Abel Saint
- Defunct: 1993; 33 years ago
- Fate: Acquired by Grupo Arcor in 1993, became a brand
- Headquarters: Buenos Aires, Argentina
- Products: Chocolate
- Brands: Tofi
- Owner: Grupo Arcor (1993–pres.)
- Website: chocolatesaguila.com

Chocolate Aguila is an Argentine chocolate brand. It is owned by Grupo Arcor. "Aguila" was the tradename used by the former company Saint Hermanos S.A., which was established in 1880, and renowned for its chocolate bars.

The company was acquired by Grupo Arcor in 1993.

== History ==
The company was established by French immigrant Abel François Charles Saint (1845–1892), first as a coffee roasting business on Carlos Pellegrini street in Buenos Aires. The company began producing chocolate in 1880. As the business grew, Saint opened a factory on Herrera street in Barracas, a neighborhood south of Buenos Aires, in 1894. Named "Saint Hermanos", the company continued producing roasted coffee and chocolate.

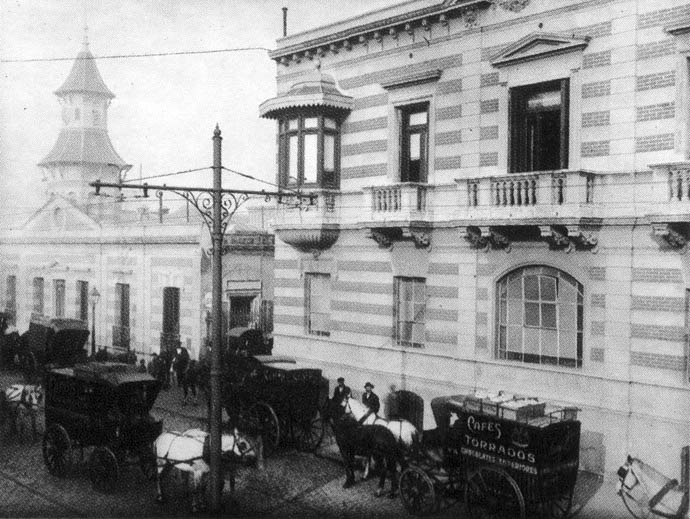
"Café torrado" carts of Saints Hnos., c. 1900

During the first half of the 20th century, the firm opened outlets in Argentina, expanding its business to Uruguay (including a plant built) and Paraguay. By 1920, Aguila added ice cream to its portfolio under the brand Laponia. The company produced and marketed bonbons, chocolate pastilles, and mint confections, among other goods.

Between the 1930s and the 1970s, the company developed a variety of products, manufacturing and commercialising more than 100 items in its factory located in Barracas. Among those products were Laponia ice creams (which employed 700 street vendors to distribute its products), Colibrí bonbons, Aguila Express, and Comprimido Aguila. The company employed 1,800 people by then.

In 1993, the company was acquired by multinational company Grupo Arcor, which expanded the Aguila brand, adding products such as ice creams, alfajores, and candies.

== Marketing ==
In the 1980s, Aguila focused on strategies to advertise its chocolate bar as an ingredient for desserts and cakes. The logo and packaging were redesigned, establishing pink as the characteristic color that has identified the brand since then.

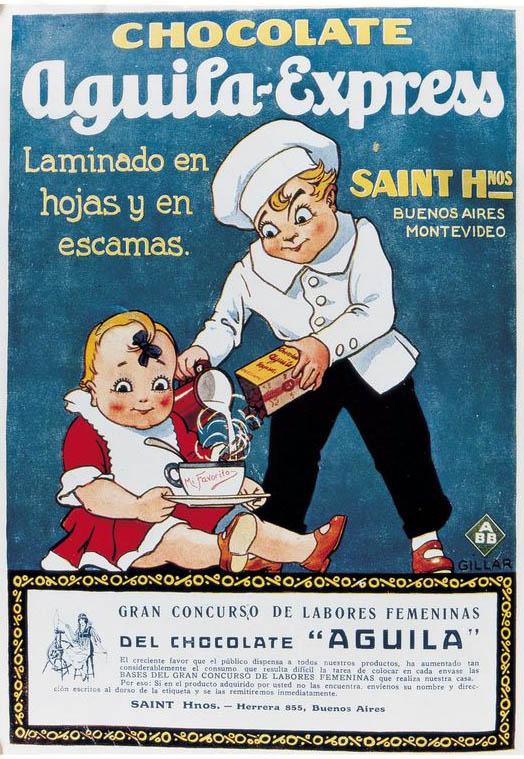
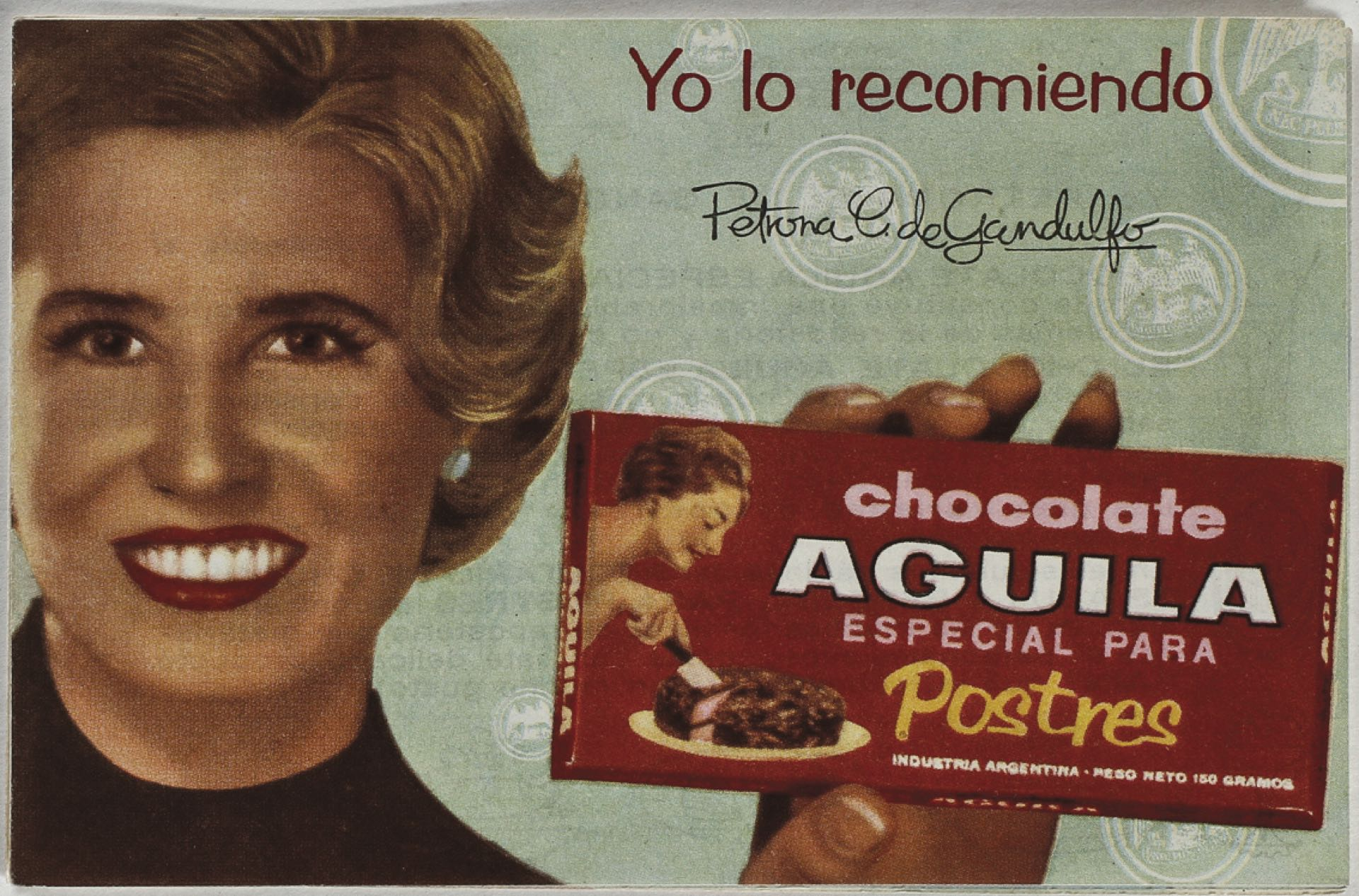
(Left): Early advertisement of Chocolate Expréss; (right): Petrona Gandulfo advertising Chocolate Aguila, c. 1930

In the 1930s, the company hired celebrity cook Petrona de Gandulfo (popularly known as "Doña Petrona") to advertise its chocolate. Gandulfo wrote a cook brochure with recipes using Aguila chocolate as the main ingredient. Those recipes were compiled in the anthology volume Doña Petrona Inédita with more than 1,000 recipes that had remained unpublished until then.

In the 1980s, the company broadcast a TV commercial starring a black man who compared himself (in a humorous tone) with a blonde-haired boy when talking of his childhood, at the end of the piece. The advertisement became a classic of the brand. Afro-Cuban pianist and actor Rigoberto Díaz de Armas played that role. The advertisement took criticism from sectors who stated that comparing African culture with chocolate was racist.

== Products ==
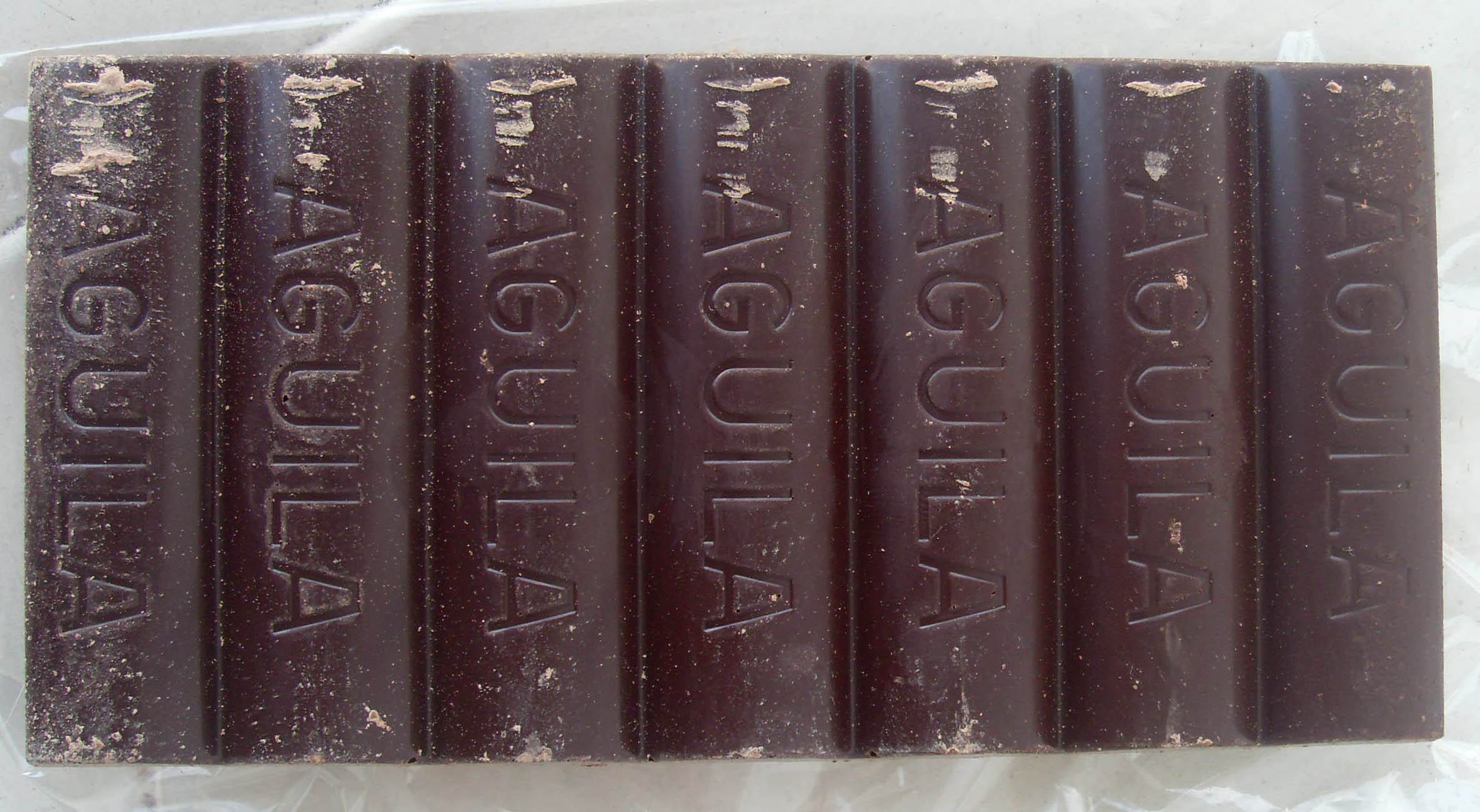
Chocolate Aguila bar

As of August 2021, Aguila sells a wide range of chocolate-based products. Apart from its classic bar, Arcor commercialises chips, syrup, alfajores, bonbons, ice creams, and candies.

== See also ==
- Grupo Arcor, owner
