= Barracas, Buenos Aires =

Neighborhood in Argentina

Barracas
- Neighborhood
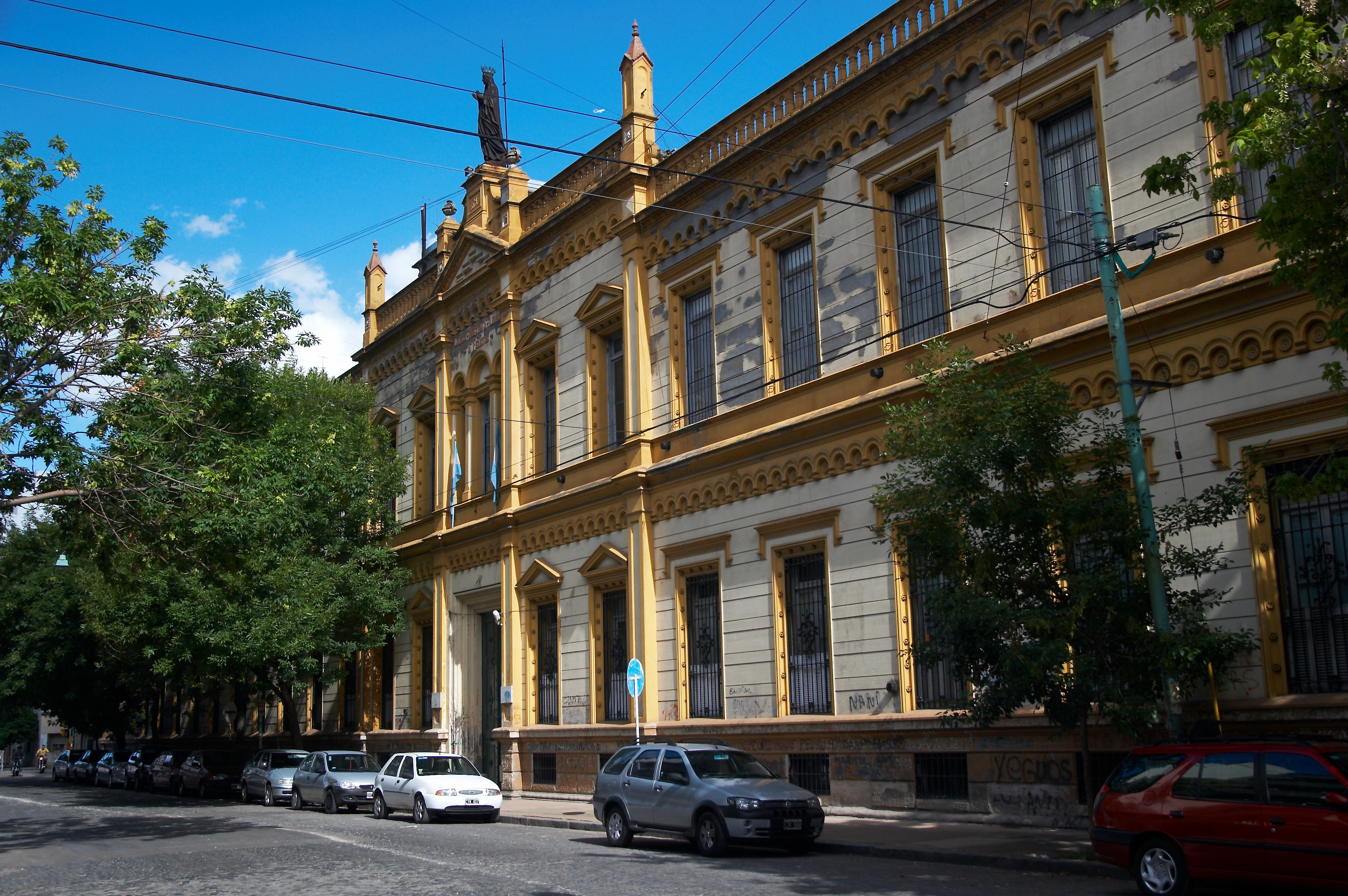
- The St. Felicity School

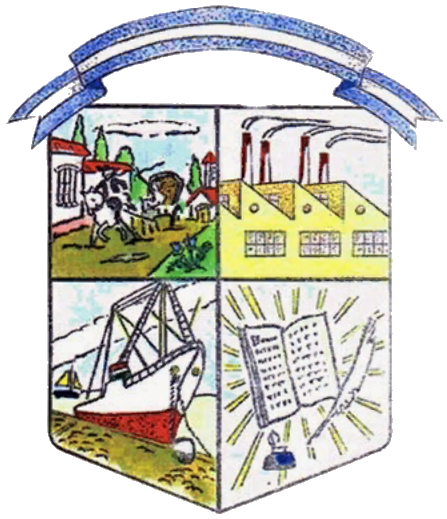
- Emblem
- Interactive map of Barracas
- Country: Argentina
- Autonomous City: Buenos Aires
- Comuna: C4

Area
  - Total: 7.6 km^{2} (2.9 sq mi)

Population (2001)
  - Total: 77,474
  - Density: 10,000/km^{2} (26,000/sq mi)
- Time zone: UTC-3 (ART)
- Day: December 13

Barracas is a barrio, or district, in the southeastern part of the city of Buenos Aires, Argentina. It is located between the railroad of Ferrocarril General Manuel Belgrano and the Riachuelo River, and the streets Regimiento de Patricios, Defensa, Caseros, Vélez Sársfield, Amancio Alcorta, Lafayette, and Lavardén. The name "Barracas" comes from the word barraca, which refers to a temporary construction of houses using rudimentary materials.

== History ==
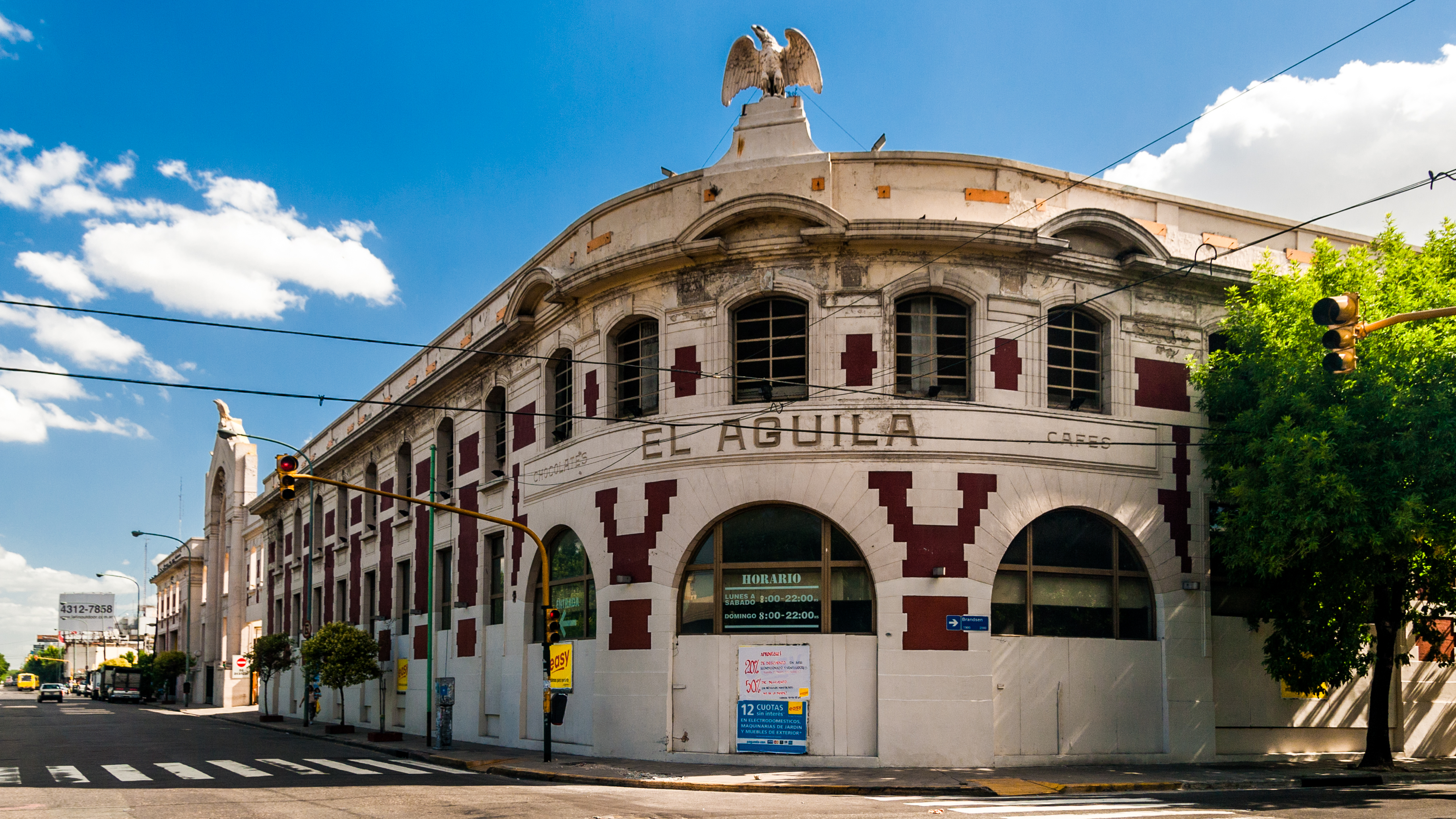
El Aguila Coffee Mill and Chocolatier, Barracas.

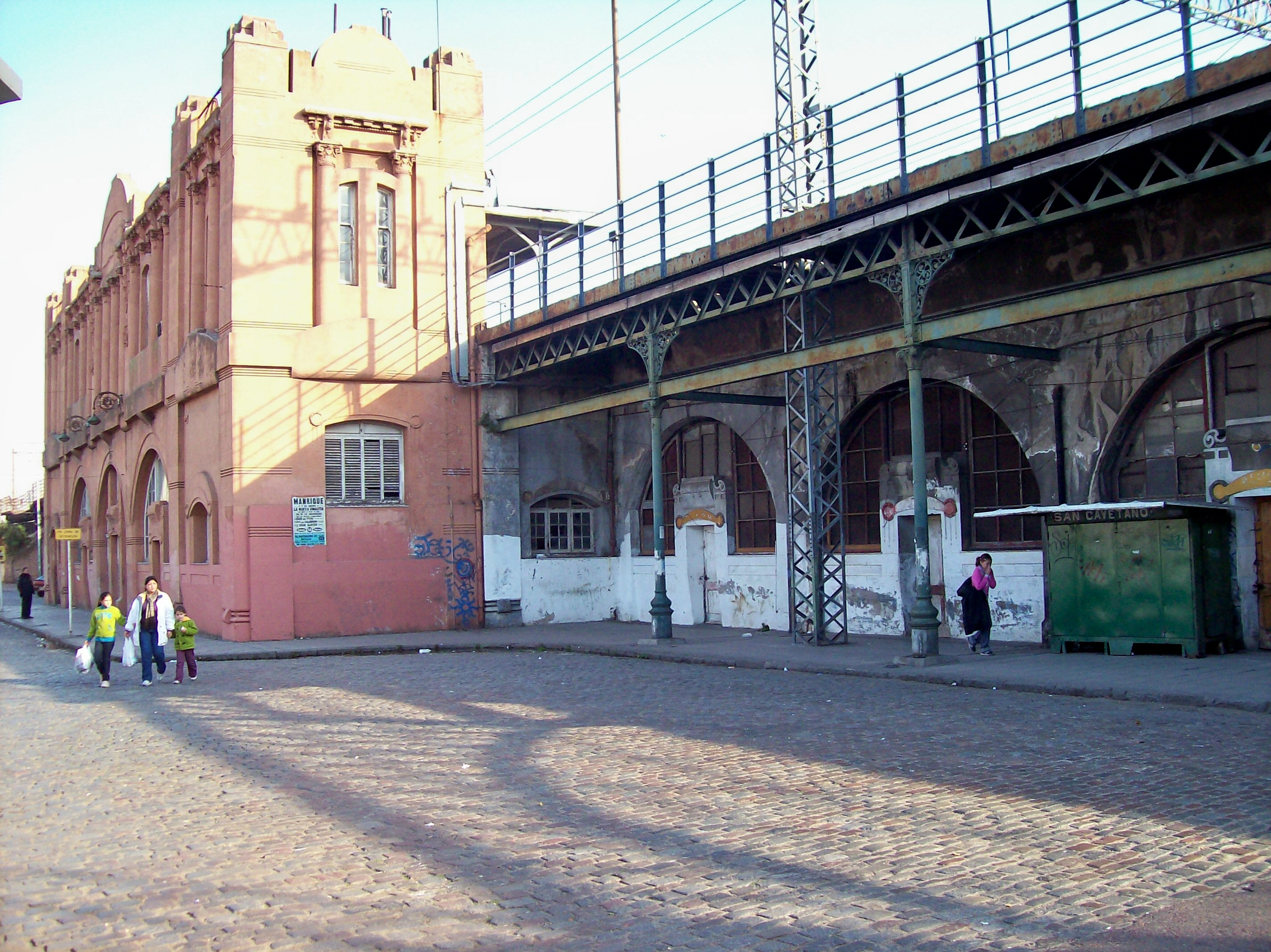
Darquier Street, a setting for Pino Solanas' acclaimed Sur (1987).

In the 18th century, "Barracas" began to grow on the banks of the Riachuelo River, becoming a slave quarter, as well as an area for leather tanneries, and abattoirs.

On March 24, 1791, a bridge was built that gave the neighborhood an important strategic value during the British invasions of the Río de la Plata. In 1858, part of this bridge was destroyed by flood and was replaced by a new iron bridge in 1871. There were a series of problems with this new bridge until the inauguration of its replacement in 1931, which still stands today.

Throughout most of the 19th century, the neighbourhood was home to some of the wealthiest families of the city. Santa Lucía avenue was the principal centre of activity and contained many of the city's most famous stores at the time. However, an 1871 yellow fever epidemic that swept through many southern parts of the city forced most wealthy families and the area's middle class to relocate to the north of the city, leaving the neighbourhood to become the working-class area that it remains today.

A number of wealthy Argentine families retained properties in Barracas during much of the 20th century, maintaining them as rental units of varying quality. Immigrants, especially Italians, started to settle here and it became popular with the working-class. Modest cafés were opened, attracting people with a lower financial status. Factories dominated the economy of the area up until around 1980, although they continue to provide an important source of employment.

The factories of Barracas began to close afterwards, and fewer train services were operated through the area. Freeway construction during the 1980s resulted in the loss of over 20 residential buildings and two public parks. The barrio set the stage for activist director Fernando Pino Solanas's 1987 film Sur (South). A chronicle of the lives of a group of friends and stockyards co-workers during Argentina's last dictatorship, Sur was as much an ode to Barracas as it was a narrative of the havoc many working-class Argentines lived through in that era.

The painting of colorful façades on Calle Lanín by local artist Marino Santa María during the 1990s has helped foster a number of redevelopment projects in the area, notably the conversion of the former Piccaluga textile factory into upscale lofts, which was completed in 2008.

In 2024, three lesbians were killed as a result of the 2024 Buenos Aires firebomb attack, which occurred at a guesthouse in Barracas.

== Design District ==
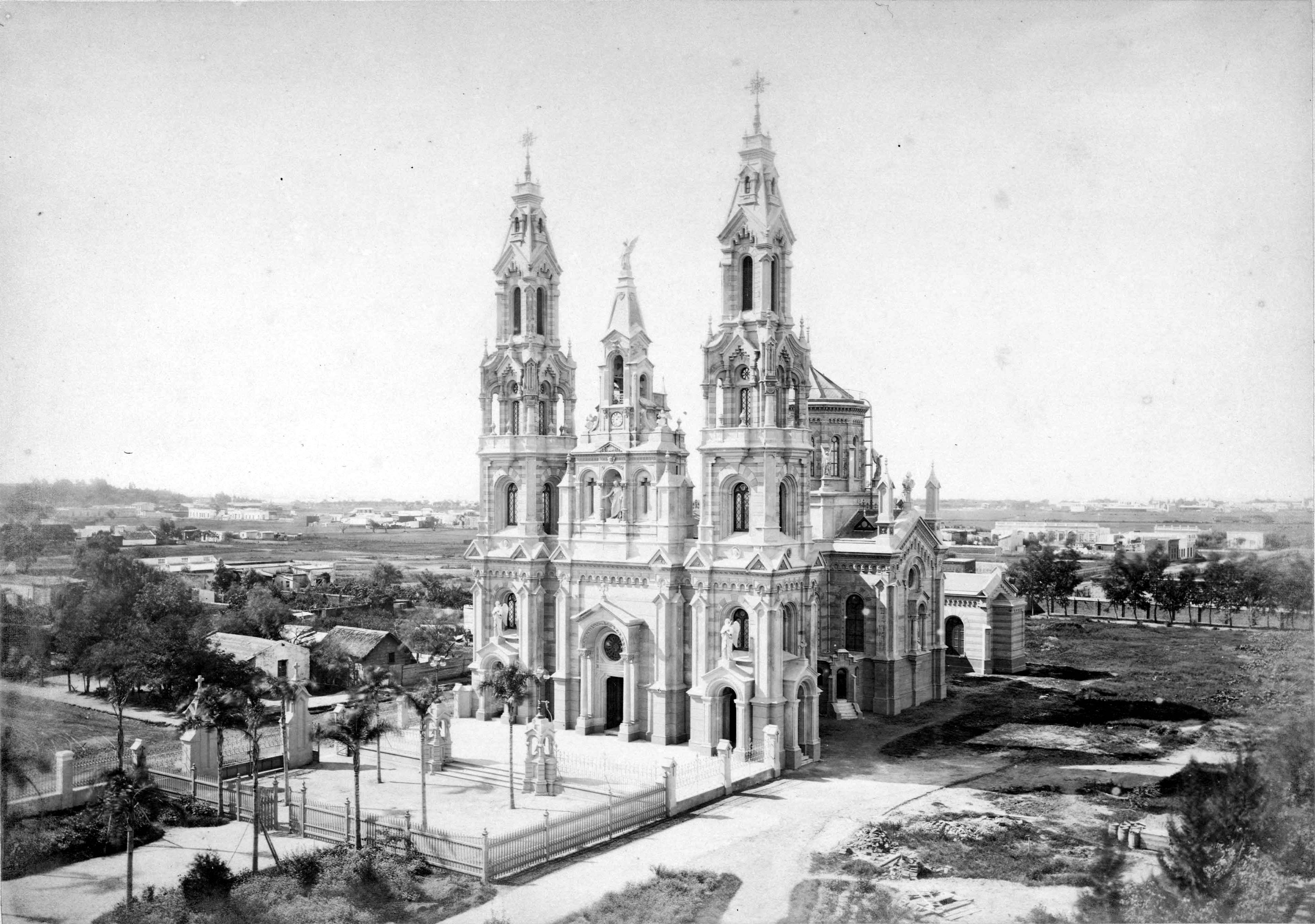
The Church of Santa Felicitas was built by the Guerrero Family in memory of their dead daughter and inaugurated in 1876.

Inside one of the sector of the neighborhood there is a 'Design District', an initiative tending to create a design and manufacture center. This effort is intended to help the south part of the city and to consolidate Buenos Aires as a UNESCO city of design, the project is based on easy credit and possibilities for those entrepreneurs who are willing to move their offices and manufacturing plants to this center, that is between the avenues Pedro de Mendoza, Velez Sarfield and the streets Australia, Brandsen and Herrera. Between the strategies for this center there are preferred loans, tax exceptions, marketing strategies and subsidies to repair real state that is too old.

== Art ==
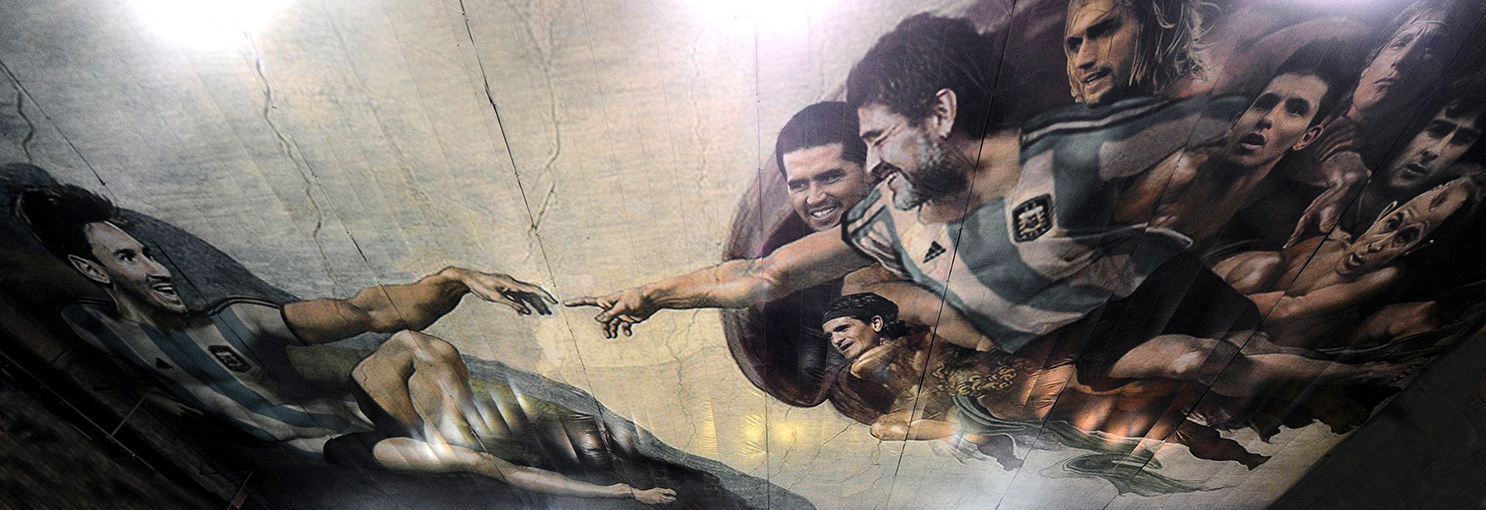
Maradona and Lionel Messi (left) depicted in a recreation of Michelangelo's The Creation of Adam painting

The "Sistine Chapel of Football" is an artwork exhibited at the Sportivo Pereyra club in Barracas. It honors two of the greatest stars in the history of Argentine football: Diego Maradona and Lionel Messi along with other leading figures such as Juan Román Riquelme, Gabriel Batistuta, Mario Kempes, Sergio Agüero, Claudio Caniggia, Ricardo Bochini and Ariel Ortega. It is inspired by Michelangelo's classic fresco The Creation of Adam found in the Vatican's Sistine Chapel in Rome. It was created in 2014 by the Argentine graphic designer and artist Santiago Barbeito (a.k.a. Santuke) but it was not until May 2018 that it became globally popular thanks to the viralization of a video filmed by an amateur who uploaded it to social networks.

== Gallery ==
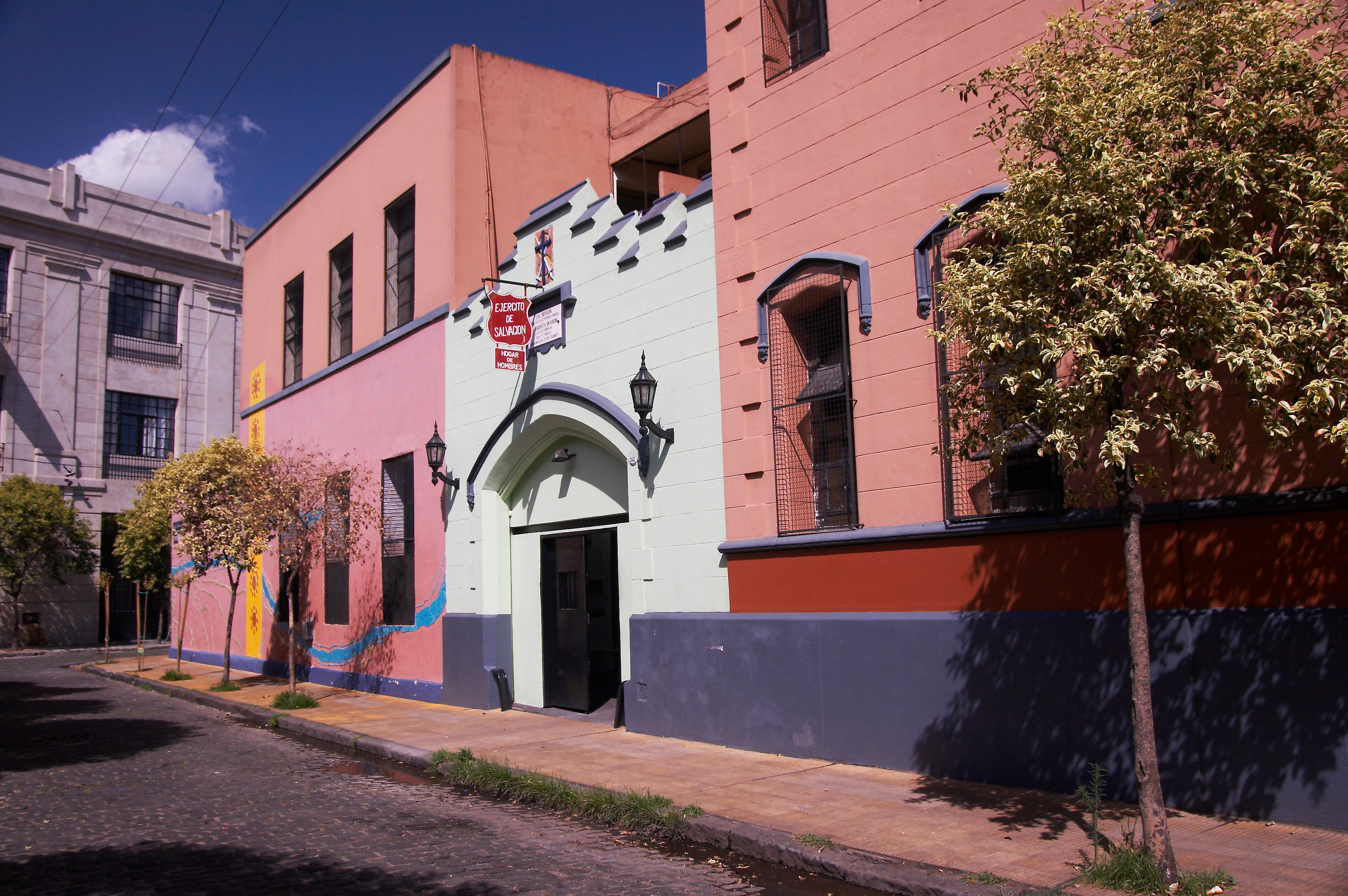
Lanín Street

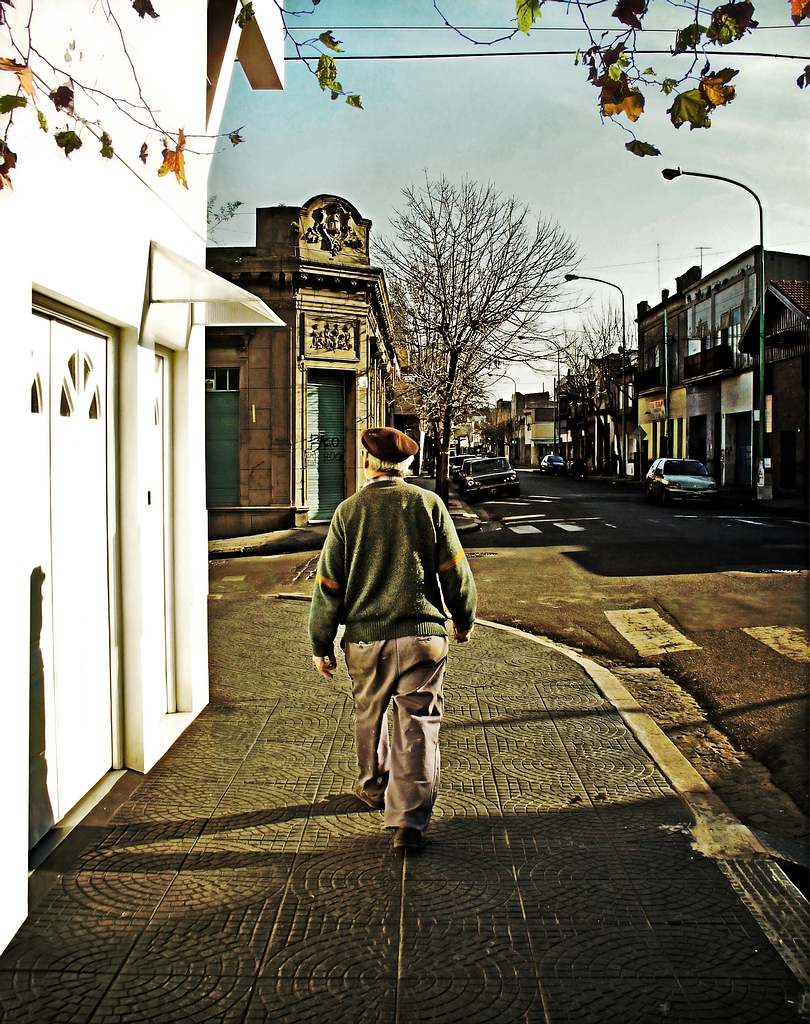
An autumn day in Barracas

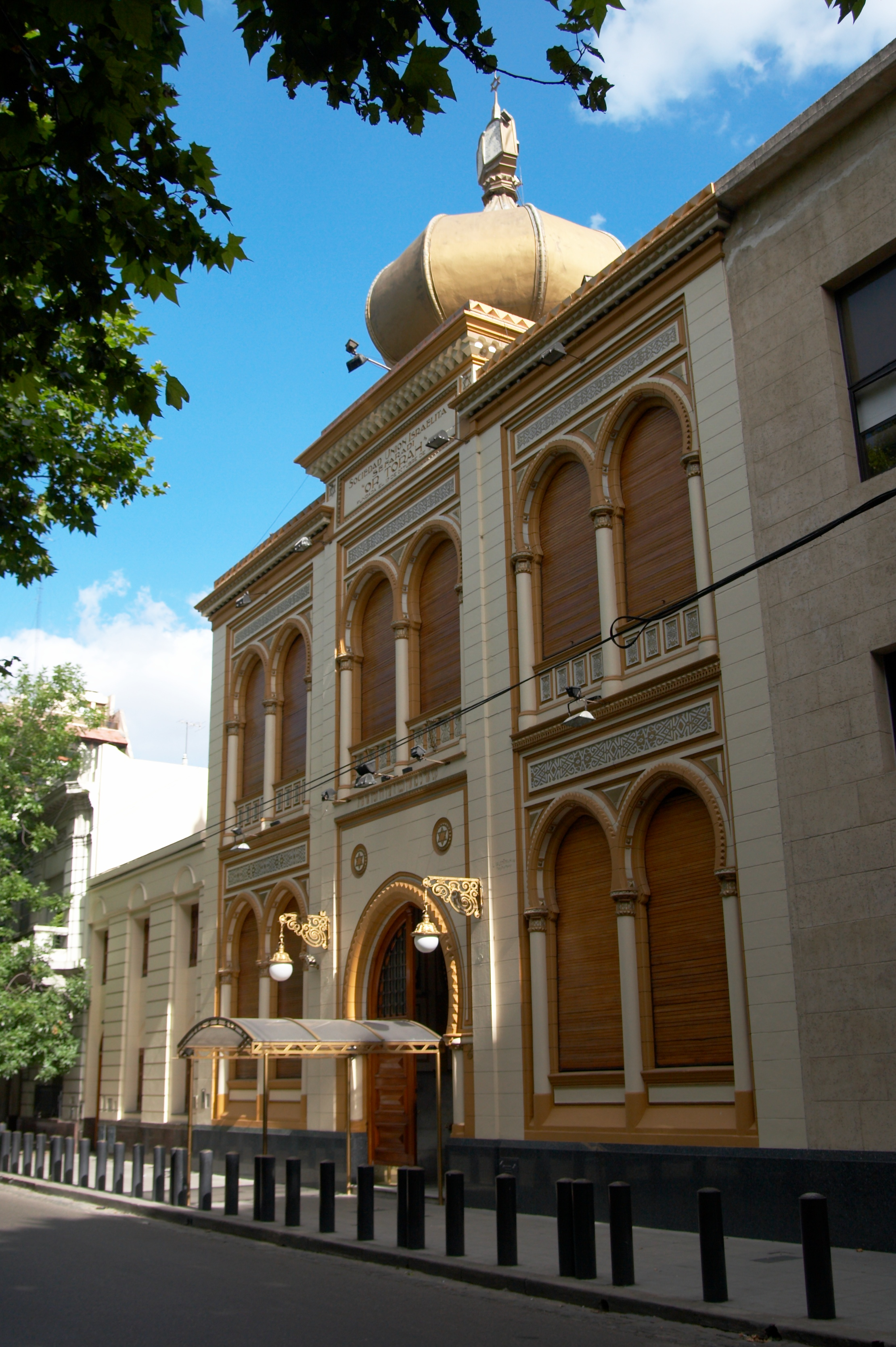
The Sephardic Jewish Synagogue

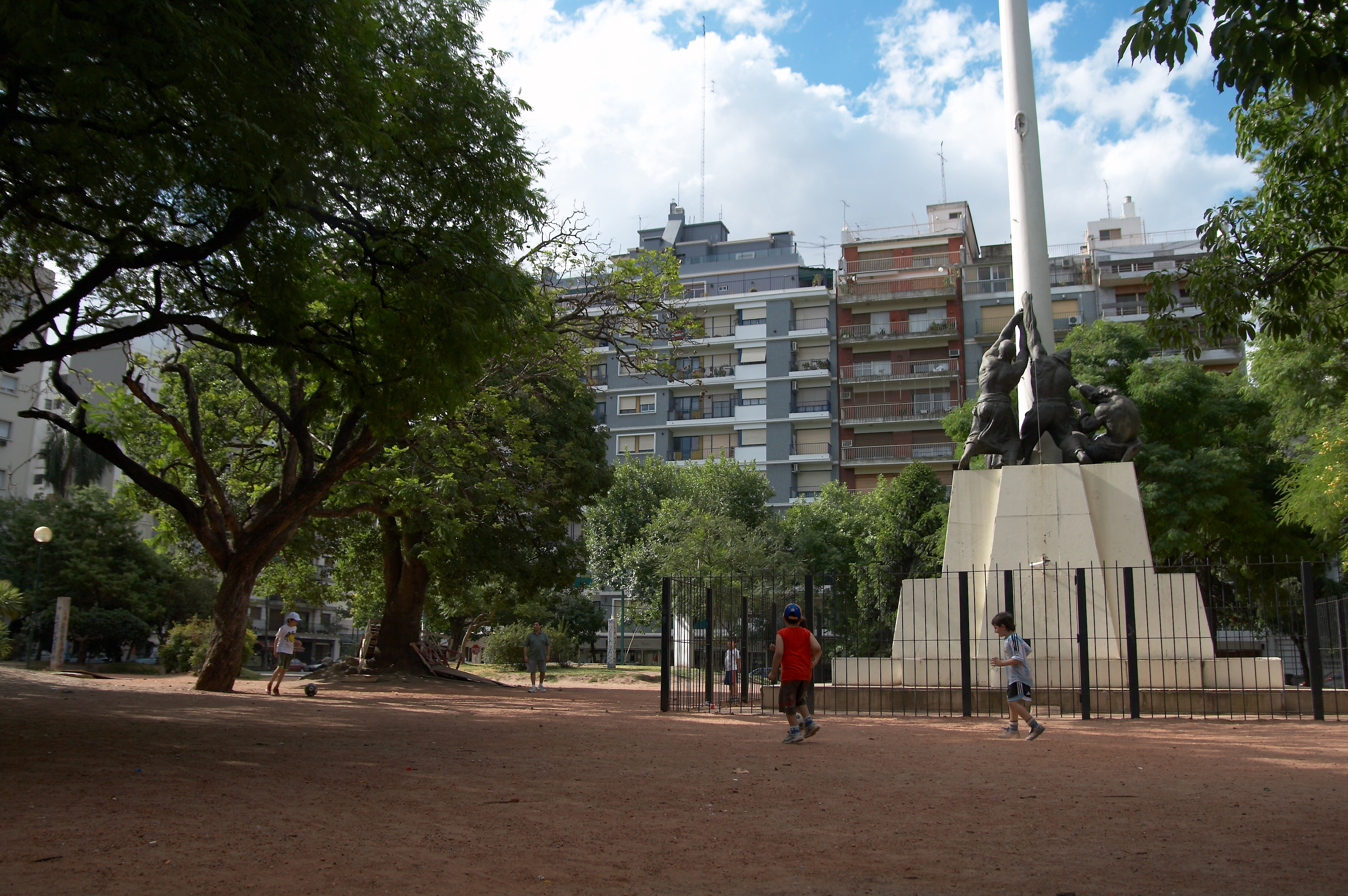
Colombia Park

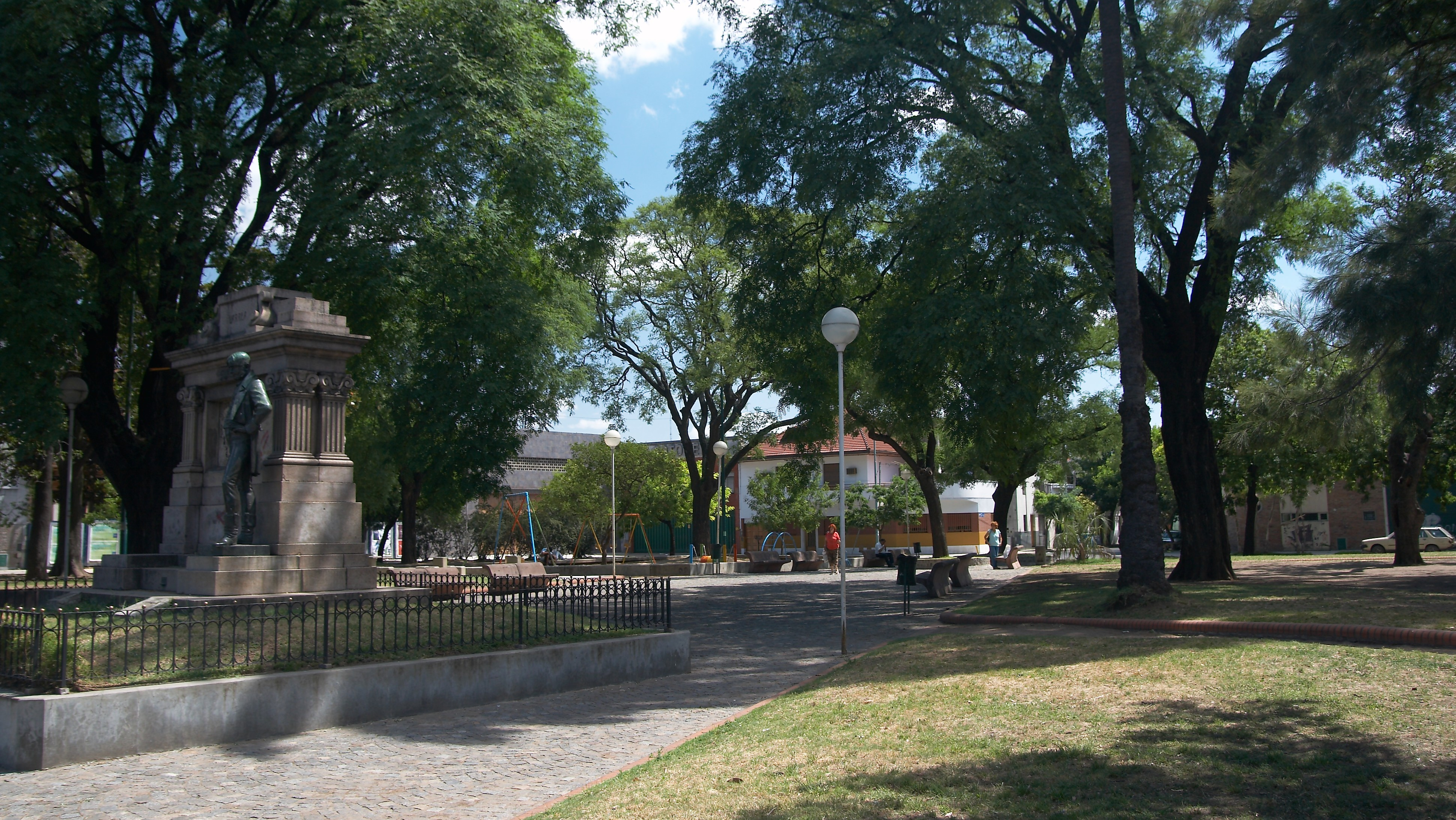
Herrera Park; at left, a monument to Argentine patriot Juan Larrea

== Notable houses ==
- Casa de Esteban de Luca
