= Death of Facundo Astudillo Castro =

Unexplained disappearance in Argentina

Facundo Astudillo Castro
- Born: 23 August 1997
- Disappeared: 30 April 2020 (aged 22); Mayor Buratovich, Buenos Aires
- Status: Found dead on 15 August 2020 after 107 days missing
- Died: 15 August 2020 (aged 22)
- Cause of death: Drowning
- Body discovered: 38.752532°S 62.448676°W

Facundo Astudillo Castro (23 August 1997 – c. 15 August 2020) was an Argentine citizen who went missing on 30 April 2020 after being stopped by the police during the COVID-19 pandemic strict lockdowns in Argentina. He was hitchhiking from Pedro Luro to Bahía Blanca, when in the town entrance of Mayor Buratovich was stopped in a police checkpoint of circulation permits. His last known image, taken the day of disappearance, depicts him being held by the police for violating the lockdown, with his hands against the police vehicle number RO 23360. It was cataloged by the victim's family as a forced disappearance in hands of the Buenos Aires Provincial Police. This theory was also followed by human rights activist Estela de Carlotto. Nora Cortiñas, another known activist in Argentina, demanded the resignation of Sergio Berni, the Buenos Aires Province Minister of Security. The minister considered this an irresponsible request.

The UN Committee on Enforced Disappearances (OHCHR) demanded the Argentine government to be expedite and thorough in the investigation, as well as to take any possible hypothesis in consideration. The Inter-American Commission on Human Rights also issued a precautionary measure. The President of Argentina, during a radio interview, stated: "We need to know what happened to Facundo. I want us to find him and, if someone was responsible for an illicit act, they will have to face the consequences".

The investigation started under the legal title of Whereabouts inquiry but then turned to a Forced disappearance investigation. In August, the involvement of the Argentine Forensic Anthropology Team in the investigation was required. His body remains were found on August 15, 2020, in an advanced state of decomposition, in an area between the cities of General Daniel Cerri and Villarino Viejo. The autopsy was done in the former ESMA in Buenos Aires, where the Argentine Forensic Anthropology Team has its laboratory. 15 experts from different areas participated in the exam, which lasted for 10 hours. The autopsy report, published by the Argentine Forensic Anthropology Team, established the cause of death as drowning while the manner of death as an unnatural death, but it couldn't be established whether it was a result of homicide, suicide, or an accident. Algae matching the one sampled in the discovery place was found in the body.

== Disappearance ==
On 30 April 2020, Facundo Astudillo Castro left his house in Pedro Luro to Bahía Blanca (both cities located in the Buenos Aires Province) to visit his ex-girlfriend, trying to get back together. At this time the country was under a strict lockdown during the COVID-19 pandemic, which required eligible persons to have a permit to travel, and punished those who violated the regulation. He did not have this permit, and traveled hitchhiking.

At around 13 hours, the young man called his mother, stating: "Mom, you have no idea where am I at, you'll never see me again".

On the same day, two Mayor Buratovich policemen intercepted the young man and made him a ticket for lockdown violation. The Astudillo family locates this at about 10 hours. As the police stopped him, they took his last known picture, which depicts him being held by the police for violating the lockdown, with his hands against the police pickup number RO 23360. A photo of his driver license was later taken.

He was later stopped at another police check for permits in the town entrance of Teniente Origone. Three witnesses claim to have seen Astudillo Castro around 3:30 p.m. in that area when two province policemen, in a Toyota Hilux pickup truck with its rear door open, supposedly stopped him and told him to get on. However, the prosecutor does not consider this enough grounds to establish that Facundo was kidnapped by the police, citing among other reasons than an officer (Alberto González) claims to have intercepted the disappeared young man around 26 kilometres further on Route 3 than what the location mentioned by the witnesses, and he took a picture of his driver's license (photo which is on record in the case file). This officer claims to have questioned Astudillo Castro, who told him he was en route to Bahía Blanca and did not have the circulation permit required. After becoming aware of this, the officer stated he radioed the Médanos police station about what to do, and he was told to let the young man go. In his statement, the police officer said that the young man kept on in a light grey Renault Duster Oroch.

== Investigation ==
On 5 July, a formal missing persons report was filed, which was assigned to Rodolfo De Lucía, head of the 20th UFI in Bahía Blanca. The family of the disappeared criticized police action, pointing out how hard they made it to file the report, and the fact that the police took note of one of Astudillo Castro's friends testimonial on a deli piece of paper.

On 17 June, Cristina Castro (his mother) reached out to Mayor Buratovich to witness a police operation, but five trucks from the Buenos Aires police blocked her.

On 25 June, the Federal System for the Search of Lost and Missing Persons became aware of the case and reported it to police and government agencies across the country through the systems of the federal Ministry of Security.

On 8 July, the Person Search division of the Federal Police joined the search. Resources were also requested from other federal forces. This same day, the police watch log book of Mayor Buratovich was seized, as well as several policemen's mobile phones.

Also on 8 July, federal judge Gabriel Marrón took on the case, with the investigation being taken by prosecutor Santiago Ulpiano Martínez. The Buenos Aires provincial police was removed from the investigation as it was under suspicions, and Adolfo Pérez Esquivel and Roberto Cipriano García (members of the Provincial Commission on Memory) were accepted as plaintiffs.

On 11 July, and by request of the Provincial Commission on Memory, a UN committee demanded the Argentinian State conduct an "expedite and thorough" investigation. The government of that time informed the UN of their absolute commitment to the investigation.

On 12 July, during a Buenos Aires police procedure looking for human remains in a Mayor Buratovich Landfill, the family attorney was threatened by a police deputy commissioner. Then, at the prosecutor's request, the provincial police left the scene to the federal police. No human remains were found that day. The deputy commissioner was discharged by order of Internal Affairs.

Between the 14 and 15 of July, 200 members of the Federal Police, the Naval Prefecture and the National Gendarmerie conducted cross country and air searches between Pedro Luro and Bahía Blanca, in an area near to the National Route 3.

On 15 July, a forensic examination was conducted on police vehicles, in search of physical and biological traces, including blood and other DNA samples. Forensics on the policemen mobile phones using Universal Forensic Extraction Device (UFED) technology were requested, as well as an analysis on the Mayor Buratovich police station logbook, looking for any kind of manipulation to hide the detention of Facundo Astudillo Castro in that station. Stains compatible with blood residue were found on the trunk of a police officer's personal vehicle and, on police pickup truck number 22788, stains on the glove compartment, back seat and rear cargo box, as well as minor stains on the steering wheel.

On 17 July, Astudillo Castro's mobile provider informed that around 19 hours on March 30, pings from the Facebook app were sent by the disappeared's phone. This was registered by two sites, one located in the National Route 3, and the other in the Bahía Blanca petrochemical pole. On 21 July, the disappeared's mother made a substitution request on the federal prosecutor, Santiago Ulpiano Martínez, citing wrongdoings in the June 19th search, such as contacting the Buenos Aires province police (which was at the moment already taken off the investigation) and data leaks published on Facebook.

Between the 25 and 27 of July, a new search was made, comprising the area between the entrance to the Villarino partido (department) and the Aguará train station. It also covered a part of National Route 3, and involved the use of canine units, Federal Police drones, and tactical divers from the National Prefecture.

On 29 July, federal judge María Gabriela Marrón denied the request for prosecutor substitution, on the ground of considering it procedurally incorrect.

On 31 July, a new search using canine units was performed in the Teniente Origone precinct, where in an abandoned cellblock an object that could belong to Astudillo Castro was found. His mother claims it was gifted to him by his grandmother.

On 7 August, and by request of the disappeared's family, new searches using canine units were performed in Mayor Buratovich, around the 780-kilometre mark of National Route 3. Burnt bone remains were found, which at the moment of the search could not be determined to belong to any person in particular. The young man's family believes he was taken into a police patrol vehicle in the whereabouts of this finding.

On 8 August, it was revealed that the girlfriend and the brother of the disappeared had been threatened by the Buenos Aires provincial policemen in search of a confession and that an illegal raid had been carried out at the family's home. The prosecutor said that these actions, despite being qualified as a felony, actually exposed the will of the police to find the young man, more than being indicative of a cover-up.

The disappeared's family made a second substitution request on the federal prosecutor, Santiago Ulpiano Martínez, on the 8th of August after he denied an arrest request on several policemen.

The prosecutor's office bought a new SIM from Claro with the disappeared young man's number, to be analyzed by the Federal Police. With this SIM card, the police entered Astudillo Castro's WhatsApp account from a fresh cellphone.

== Body discovery ==
Astudillo Castro's remains were found on 15 August 2020, in an advanced state of decomposition, in an area between the cities of General Daniel Cerri and Villarino Viejo. The autopsy was done in the former ESMA in Buenos Aires, where the Argentine Forensic Anthropology Team has its laboratory. 15 experts from different areas participated in the exam, which lasted for 10 hours.

The autopsy report, published by the Argentine Forensic Anthropology Team, established the cause of death as drowning while the manner of death as an unnatural death, but it couldn't be established whether it was a result of homicide, suicide, or an accident.

However, the analysis of the water diatoms (a form of algae) found in Astudillo Castro's marrow demonstrated clearly that he had not drowned in the location he was found. Of the 17 different types of diatoms found in the local water, only 5 were found present in Astudillo Castro's marrow. The forensic dentist Marta Maldonado claimed that Astudillo Castro's teeth showed that his death was violent. The Facundo Castro family appointed an independent forensic expert Virginia Creimer who criticised the autopsy of the EAAF, due to its links with the Argentinean state. She claimed that the EAAF forensics appeared in a hurry to perform the autopsy before all the forensic experts had assembled for the autopsy. Creimer also claimed that the EAAF forensics seemed biased towards the non-violent death hypothesis. Creimer hypothesised that Facundo Astudillo Castro was drowned in another location and then transferred to the place his body was discovered, possibly due to waterboarding, a common torturing technique that Argentinean security forces are known to apply on occasion.

== Suspects ==
Since the disappearance, four Buenos Aires provincial policemen are suspected, due to changes and contradictions in their statements. The two main suspects are Mario Gabriel Sosa and Jana Jennifer Curuhinca who arrested Astudillo Castro, took photos of him and his identity card during his arrest. Sosa and Curuhinca appeared to be worried following Castro's disappearance in WhatsApp message exchanges. The agents deleted the application WhatsApp soon after Facundo's disappearance. The court did not find this extraordinary as it was claimed that "we all delete applications". A police car had been circulating close to the location where Astudillo Castro's body was discovered, evidence that was obtained thanks to the police's geolocation system. This raises suspicions that police agents might have been involved in Facundo's death. There are also allegations that some of the suspects tried to influence investigations. Sergeant Siomara Flores appears to have participated in the investigation of Facundo's death despite the fact that she is the half-sister of agent Curuhinca. Agent Sosa was also identified by a member of Facundo's ex-girlfriend's family as being part of a police party that interrogated him, asked him to claim that Facundo was involved with drugs. The same person testified that both agent Sosa and agent Curuhinca were present in the interrogation and appeared very anxious, while the house of Facundo's ex-girlfriend was also searched by a police party without prior authorization. The police party appears to have illegally visited Facundo's ex-girlfriend home and put pressure on her to falsely testify that Facundo had "problems with drugs".

Despite the family requests on their arrest, the prosecutors office considers (as of 13 August) that there is not enough evidence to jail the policemen.

== See also ==
- Death of Luis Espinoza
- Luciano Arruga
- List of cases of police brutality in Argentina
- List of solved missing person cases (2020s)
- List of unsolved deaths
