= Hilario Ascasubi, Buenos Aires =

Hilario Ascasubi
- Location in Argentina Hilario Ascasubi (Buenos Aires Province)
- Coordinates: 39°22′S 62°38′W
- Country: Argentina
- Province: Buenos Aires
- Partido: Villarino

Population (2005)
  - Total: 4,689
- Postal code: B 8142

Hilario Ascasubi is a town in the southwest corner of Buenos Aires Province, Argentina, in the partido of Villarino Partido. It is located on National Route 3. The town is named after Argentine poet Hilario Ascasubi, and a railroad service opened in the town in 1913.

The town is located approximately 70 km south of Médanos (the capital of Villarino Partido), and 106 km south of Bahía Blanca, the nearest major city.

== History ==
The area was first settled by the Spanish in the mid Sixteenth Century. A fort and a chapel, Capilla de Rodríguez, were established on the north bank of the Ctalamochita River (Tercero River) as part of the encomienda of a Captain Juan Francisco Rodríguez, an officer in the service of Don Gerónimo Luis de Cabrera.

The town of Hilario Ascasubi was founded on 1 September 1912. Rail service was brought to the town the following year. The important road bridge over the Ctalamochita River was completed in October 1923.

In 2024 the town was inundated by parrots due to destruction of their habitat in the surrounding area.

== Climate ==
Hilario Ascasubi has a borderline humid subtropical climate/semi-arid climate (Köppen climate classification Cfa/BSk). with hot, summers and cooler, drier winters.

Climate data for Hilario Ascasubi (1966–2013)
Month	Jan	Feb	Mar	Apr	May	Jun	Jul	Aug	Sep	Oct	Nov	Dec	Year
Record high °C (°F)	42.9 (109.2)	39.6 (103.3)	39.1 (102.4)	32.6 (90.7)	29.1 (84.4)	26.9 (80.4)	26.1 (79.0)	28.5 (83.3)	30.8 (87.4)	33.8 (92.8)	37.5 (99.5)	39.7 (103.5)	42.9 (109.2)
Mean daily maximum °C (°F)	29.7 (85.5)	29.0 (84.2)	25.5 (77.9)	21.2 (70.2)	17.3 (63.1)	13.6 (56.5)	13.6 (56.5)	16.0 (60.8)	18.7 (65.7)	21.9 (71.4)	25.3 (77.5)	28.3 (82.9)	21.7 (71.1)
Daily mean °C (°F)	22.3 (72.1)	21.2 (70.2)	18.6 (65.5)	14.8 (58.6)	11.1 (52.0)	8.0 (46.4)	7.6 (45.7)	9.3 (48.7)	11.7 (53.1)	14.6 (58.3)	18.0 (64.4)	20.8 (69.4)	14.8 (58.6)
Mean daily minimum °C (°F)	14.0 (57.2)	13.4 (56.1)	11.5 (52.7)	8.1 (46.6)	4.8 (40.6)	2.5 (36.5)	1.7 (35.1)	2.6 (36.7)	4.6 (40.3)	7.4 (45.3)	10.4 (50.7)	12.8 (55.0)	7.8 (46.0)
Record low °C (°F)	1.5 (34.7)	1.4 (34.5)	0.2 (32.4)	−2.6 (27.3)	−6.0 (21.2)	−9.5 (14.9)	−10.8 (12.6)	−8.2 (17.2)	−7.5 (18.5)	−4.2 (24.4)	−1.1 (30.0)	1.7 (35.1)	−10.8 (12.6)
Average precipitation mm (inches)	49.4 (1.94)	55.9 (2.20)	62.4 (2.46)	44.6 (1.76)	28.1 (1.11)	22.8 (0.90)	22.0 (0.87)	26.1 (1.03)	37.2 (1.46)	44.7 (1.76)	44.0 (1.73)	52.0 (2.05)	492.0 (19.37)
Average relative humidity (%)	57	60	67	68	73	75	72	67	64	63	58	57	65
Mean monthly sunshine hours	310.0	268.4	244.9	198.0	164.3	132.0	139.5	179.8	195.0	238.7	270.0	291.4	2,632
Source: Instituto Nacional de Tecnología Agropecuaria

== See also ==
- Villarino Partido
