= Al Este =

Argentinian winery

Coordinates: 38°48′S 62°41′W

Al Este Bodega y Viñedos
- Location: Médanos, Buenos Aires, Argentina
- Appellation: Medanos (appellation)
- Other labels: Al Este, Al Este Clasico, Terrasabbia Reserva, Terrasabbia
- Founded: 1999
- First vintage: 2006
- Key people: Alberto Antonini, winemaker
- Varietals: Malbec, Cabernet Sauvignon, Chardonnay, Sauvignon blanc, Tannat, Merlot, Cabernet Franc
- Distribution: international
- Tasting: open to public for visits, special events by appointment

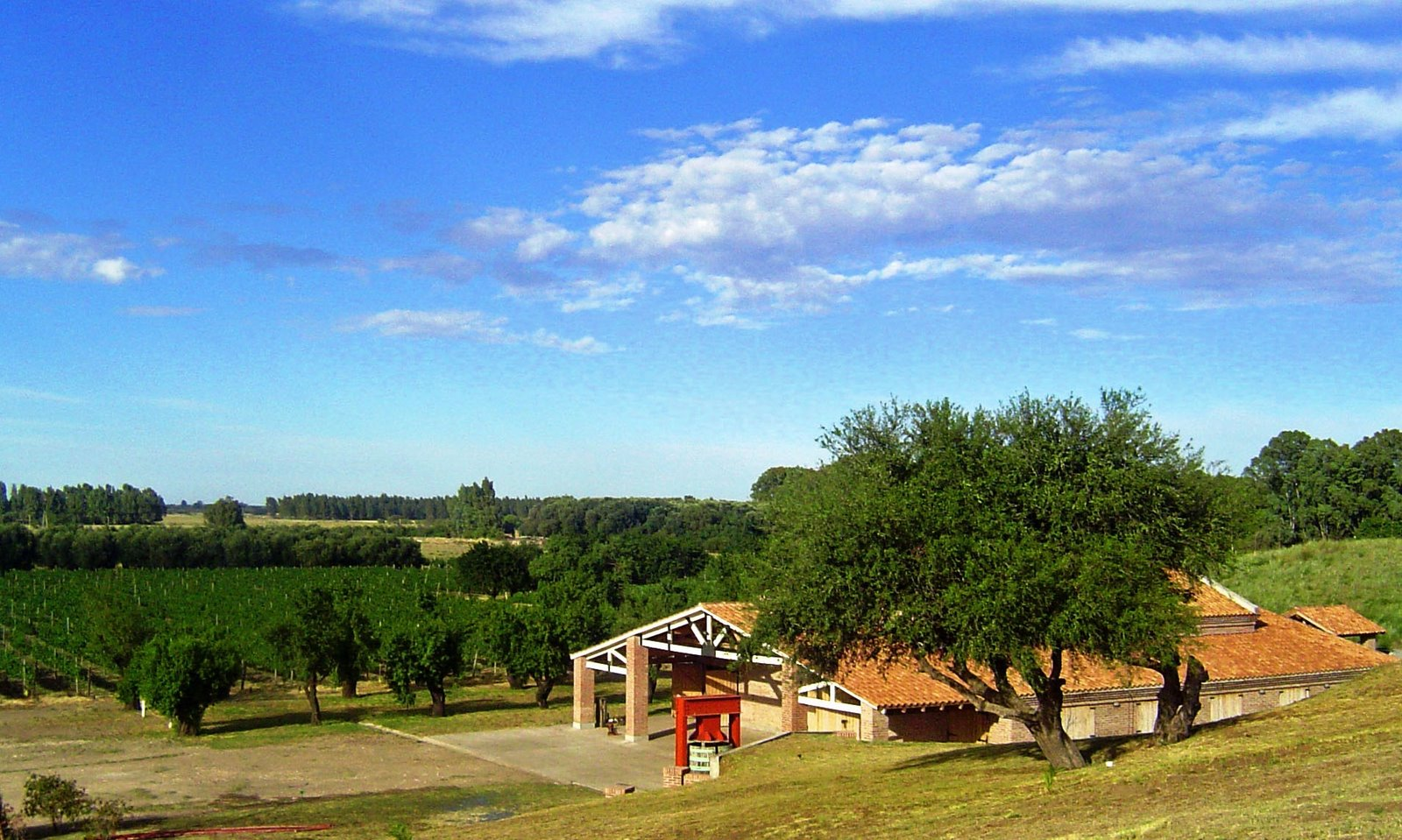
Al Este vineyards and winery in Médanos, Buenos Aires

Al Este Bodega y Viñedos is a winery in Médanos, Buenos Aires Province, Argentina. It consists of vineyards (in owned lands that exceed 300 hectares (740 acres)) and an adjacent winery, located 640 km (400 mi) south of the city of Buenos Aires on the southern tip of the Buenos Aires province. The project has been developed under the direction of the Italian wine maker Alberto Antonini.

In its first submission to a wine contest, Al Este was awarded a silver medal in the White Wine category in the 2009 Decanter World Wine Awards, the world's largest wine contest, celebrated in London. Al Este's award-winning wine is recommended by Decanter in sixth position as one of the top chardonnays in 2009.

== History ==
In the early 20th century, numerous European immigrants arrived in Médanos, bringing along the tradition of winemaking with them. Although at some point a multitude of small growers planted a combined surface of approximately 200 hectares of vineyards, they were unable to successfully complete the wine making process given lack of scale, inadequate technology and the country's ups and downs which led to their disappearance.

The Médanos terroir, that had traditionally been dedicated to garlic and pastures, has striking similarities to Bordeaux, France in terms of its soil, weather conditions and proximity to the sea. More recently, the idea of starting a wine project in Médanos got reignited as a result of a trip to France which provided renewed confidence in the terroir's potential.

In 2000, a hectare and a half was planted on an experimental basis with nine grape varietals. In a second stage, after analyzing the obtained quality standards for each grape variety at the Instituto Nacional de Tecnología Agropecuaria (INTA), 25 additional hectares were planted mainly with six varietals.

== Grape varieties ==
Al Este produces several varietals.

Red: Malbec, Cabernet Sauvignon, Merlot, Tannat, Cabernet Franc

White: Chardonnay, Sauvignon blanc

== Vineyards and winery ==
The vineyards are located at 39 degrees latitude south, where Patagonia and the Pampas converge, approximately 40 km from the Atlantic Ocean. Windy springs help develop thicker skins that contribute to the intense color of these wines. The geological foundation of the Médanos region is limestone, leading to a soil structure that is heavy in calcium. The soil has high sand content, which doesn't retain as much humidity, and as a consequence this terroir absorbs and liberates heat faster creating a large temperature range which favors the development and growth of grapes.

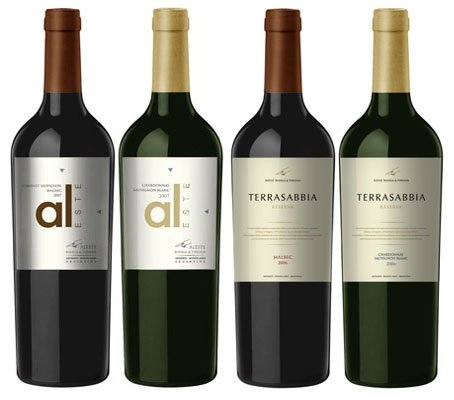
Al Este and Terrasabbia wines

Topography: Flatland with meadows (médanos)

Soil type: Sandy over a calcareous plate

Irrigation system: Dripping

Frost protection: Water spraying by aspersion

Harvesting and grape selection: Manual

Plant support system: Espalier

The winery produces red and white wines, which are aged in French and American oak and in bottles in its underground cellars. It is the first company to grow, produce and sell premium wines in the Buenos Aires Province.

== Domaine Al Este ==
Domaine Al Este is a 290 hectares terroir located in Médanos, Buenos Aires Province, Argentina. Developed by Al Este, it was the result of a careful analysis and screening of land in this new terroir that was particularly apt for the growth of vineyards dedicated to the production of premium wines.

The vineyards are located at 39 degrees latitude south, where the Patagonia and Pampa converge, approximately 40 km from the Atlantic Ocean.

Topography: Flatland with meadows (médanos)

Soil type: Sandy over a calcareous plate

Weather: Oceanic influence, with a windy Spring

Rainfall: 500mm per year

== See also ==
- Medanos (appellation)
- Buenos Aires wines
