= Pedro Luro, Buenos Aires =

Pedro Luro
- Town
- Location within Buenos Aires Province
- Coordinates: 39°30′S 62°41′W
- Country: Argentina
- Province: Buenos Aires
- Partidos: Villarino
- Established: November 20, 1913
- Elevation: 5 m (16 ft)

Population (2022 Census)
  - Total: 11,114
- Time zone: UTC−3 (ART)
- CPA Base: B 8418
- Climate: Dfc

Pedro Luro is a town located in the southern end of the Villarino Partido in the province of Buenos Aires, Argentina.

== History ==
Pedro Luro was founded on November 20, 1913, after the provincial government approved the town's establishment.

== Population ==
According to INDEC, which collects population data for the country, the town had a population of 6,626 people as of the 2001 census.
