= Mayor Buratovich =

- Location in Argentina
- Coordinates: 39°15′S 62°37′W
- Country: Argentina
- Province: Buenos Aires
- Partido: Villarino
- Founded: April 27, 1913

Population (2001)
  - Total: 4,268
- Postal code: B 8146

Mayor Buratovich is a town in the southwest corner Buenos Aires Province, Argentina, in the partido of Villarino Partido. It is located on National Route 3 (Argentina).

The town is named after Croatian military engineer Santiago Buratovich (Jakov Buratović, Hvar, 1846 - Buenos Aires, 1909), who worked on the construction of the Suez Canal. He came to Buenos Aires in 1869, and worked as an engineer, including on telegraph line work, and in military struggles against Indians. Buratovich advocated for the development of rail service to the area, and a station opened in 1912 where the town developed. In 1913, the station was renamed Mayor Buratovich for Buratovich's services to the country.

The rural area's primary economic activity is agricultural, focusing almost exclusively the production on onions for export. Migrant workers from northern Argentina and Bolivia now perform much of the farm labor.

The town is located approximated 58 km south of Médanos (the capital of Villarino Partido), and 92 km south of Bahía Blanca, the nearest major city.

== Famous residents ==
- Rocío Marengo, model and actress (born in the town)

== See also ==
- Villarino Partido
- Plaza Buratovich, Rosario

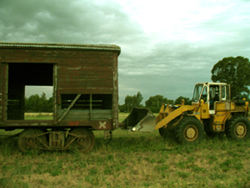
The "Un vagón hermoso" project is restoring two abandoned rail cars in the town
