= Cape San Antonio =

Cape San Antonio, or in Spanish Cabo San Antonio, may refer to:

- Cape San Antonio, Argentina
- Cape San Antonio, Cuba
- Cape San Antonio, Spain
