= Samborombón Bay =

Bay in northern Argentina

- Bahía de Samborombón (Spanish)
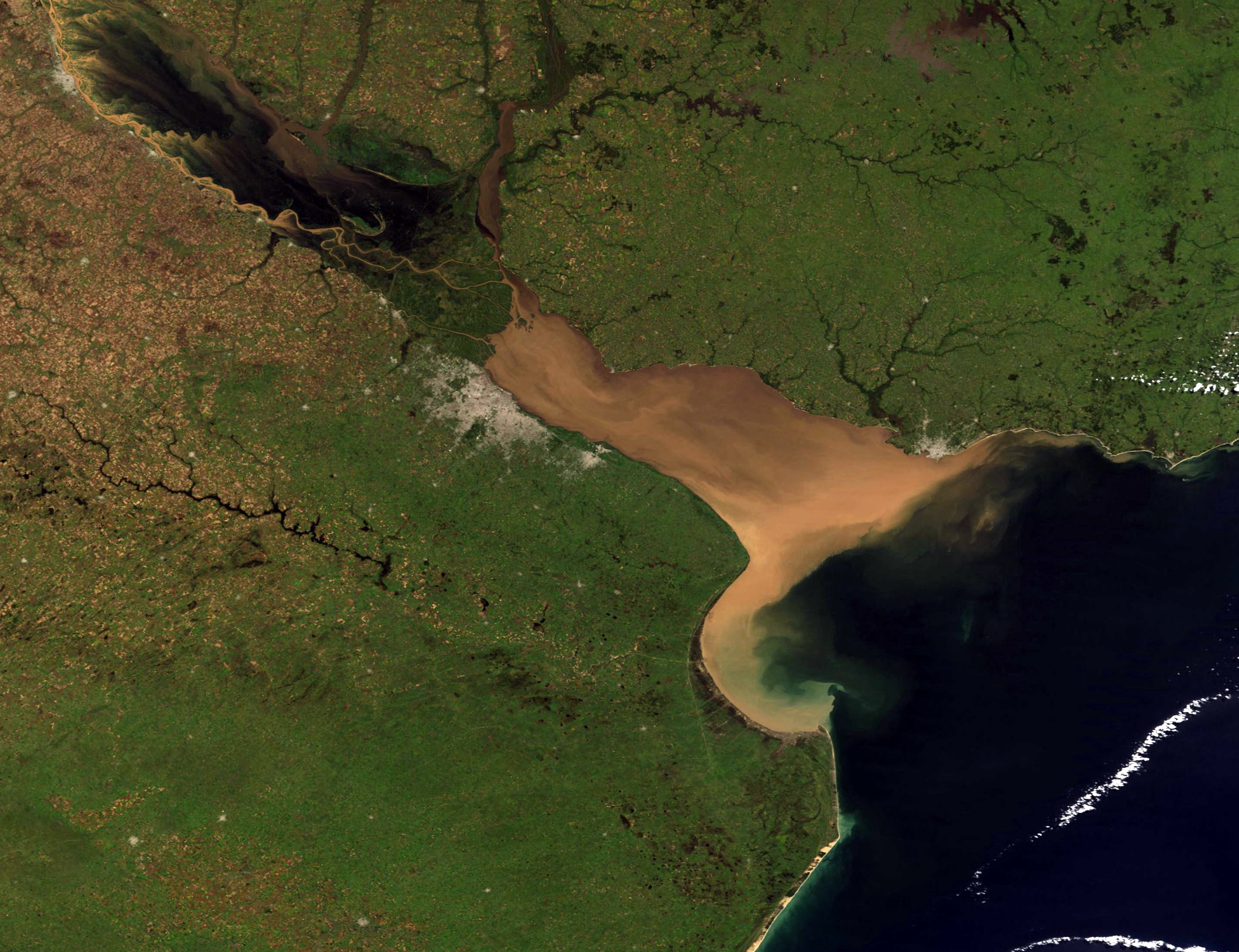
- Visible as a C-shaped indentation in the coast near the southern end of the Río de la Plata estuary

- Location within Buenos Aires Province
- Location: South America
- Coordinates: 35°54′S 57°05′W
- River sources: Salado River, Samborombón River
- Ocean/sea sources: Argentine Sea, South Atlantic Ocean
- Basin countries: Argentina
- Max. width: 135 km (84 mi)
- Surface area: 2,500 km^{2} (970 sq mi)
- Settlements: General Lavalle, San Clemente del Tuyú

Ramsar Wetland
- Official name: Bahía de Samborombón
- Designated: 24 January 1997
- Reference no.: 885

Samborombón Bay (Spanish: Bahía de Samborombón) is a bay on the coast of Buenos Aires Province, Argentina. Located at the Río de la Plata's mouth on the Argentine Sea, it begins about 160 kilometres (99 mi) southeast of Buenos Aires and is about 135 kilometres (84 mi) wide.

== Toponymy ==
The bay is thought to have been named in 1520 by members of Ferdinand Magellan's expedition, who attributed its nearly semicircular shape to the detachment of legendary Saint Brendan's Island from the South American mainland ("Samborombón" being a corruption of San Borondón). The Samborombón River and the town of Samborombón share the bay's name.

== Geography ==
Samborombón Bay is located at the mouth of the Río de la Plata, stretching from Punta Piedras in the north to Punta Rasa in the south, where Cape San Antonio begins. Depending on the boundaries used, the bay can be considered an estuary stretch of the Río de la Plata or a large bay of the Argentine Sea; the International Hydrographic Organization defines the eastern boundary of the Río de la Plata as "a line joining Punta del Este, Uruguay and Cabo San Antonio, Argentina," a definition which includes Samborombón Bay as part of the river.

== Hydrology ==
The bay receives inflow from the Southern Salado River, the Samborombón River, and other smaller streams, as well as numerous artificial canals constructed to drain eastern Buenos Aires Province. It also experiences a substantial flow of water coming out from the Río de la Plata into the Argentine Sea.

== Conservation ==
Samborombón Bay exhibits an unusually high density of shorebird species, many of which use the bay as a stopping point in their seasonal migrations. It also serves as an important nursery habitat for fish species in the Río de la Plata estuary system. The bay and the adjoining coastal region are included in a number of protected areas because of the well preserved Pampas grassland and wetland ecosystems that characterize the area.

The Province of Buenos Aires' Provincial Body for Sustainable Development has designated the central portion of the coast as the Samborombón Bay Provincial Nature Reserve because of its importance as a wildlife refuge; parts of the southern coast are included in the Rincón de Ajó Provincial Nature Reserve. The bay is also designated as a Western Hemisphere Shorebird Reserve Network Site of International Importance, as well as a Ramsar Wetland of International Importance, reflecting its significance as a habitat for the buff-breasted sandpiper and other threatened species. The southern shore includes Campos del Tuyú National Park, home to a population of rare Pampas deer.

== Recreation ==
The Samborombón Bay coast is known for its excellent sport fishing, particularly in the waters near Punta Rasa and the town of General Lavalle, where large saltwater species such as black drum are abundant.
