= Salado River (Buenos Aires) =

River in Buenos Aires, Argentina

Coordinates: 35°44′44″S 57°21′51″W

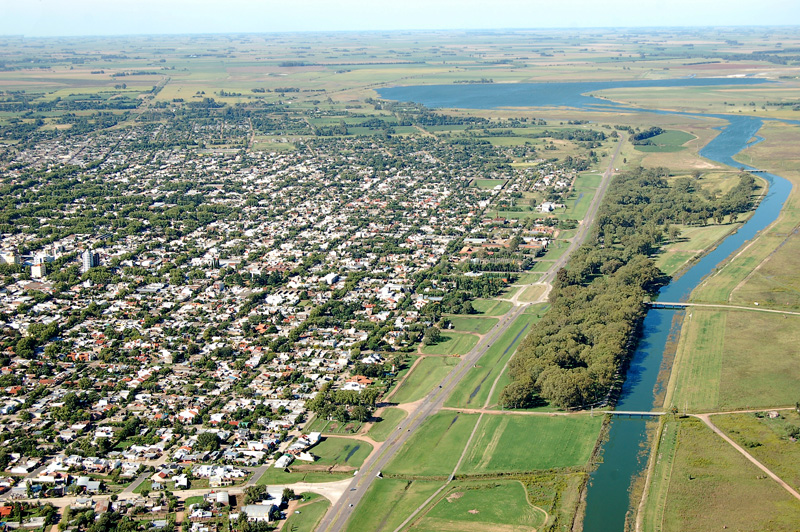
Junín on the Río Salado

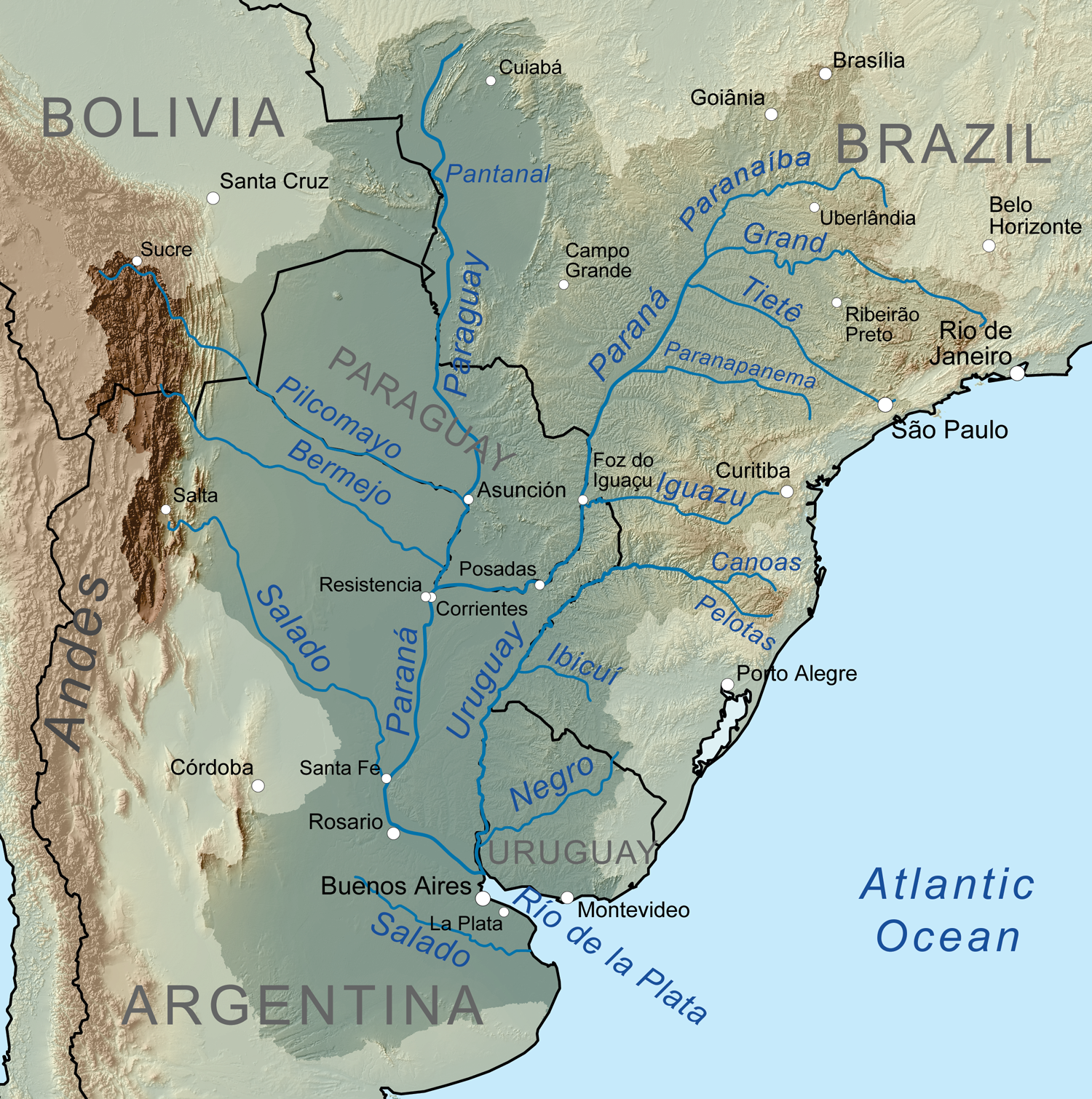
Map of the Rio de la Plata Basin, showing the Salado River joining the Río de la Plata southeast of Buenos Aires.

The Salado River (Spanish: Río Salado, Spanish pronunciation: [ˈri.o saˈlaðo]) is a river in northern Buenos Aires Province, Argentina. It originates at El Chañar Lake on the boundary with Santa Fe Province, 40 metres (130 ft) above mean sea level, and flows generally southeast for 640 kilometres (400 mi) before debouching into Samborombón Bay, part of the Río de la Plata estuary on the Atlantic Ocean. The Salado's mouth is about 170 kilometres (110 mi) south of the city of Buenos Aires.

The Salado's drainage basin is about 170,000 square kilometres (66,000 sq mi), which is over half of the province's area. The region receives an annual average of 2,000 millimetres (79 in) of precipitation, which often causes flooding in the low-lying area. The river flows by the cities of Junín, Roque Pérez, and General Belgrano, as well as a number of wetlands and lakes; channelization of the lower course has improved the drainage of the river's 88 cubic metres per second (3,100 cu ft/s). Nearly 1 million people live in the basin.

Hydrological studies have been performed in the Salado basin, principally in the Azul, Buenos Aires creek basin by the Instituto de Hidrologia de Llanuras de Azul. Ecological studies have been done by the Ecology group of Facultad de Agronomía de la UNICEN.

In the 19th century, before the Conquest of the Desert, the Salado River served as frontier boundary between the Spanish colonised lands and those still under control of the indigenous peoples.

Because Argentina has another, more important Salado River, in the northern part of the country, this Salado River is sometimes called Salado del Sur ("Southern Salado").

== See also ==
- List of rivers of Argentina
