= Cape San Antonio, Argentina =

Cape in Buenos Aires Province, Argentina

Coordinates: 36.293095°S 56.777°W

Cape San Antonio, or in Spanish Cabo San Antonio, is a cape extending into the Atlantic Ocean on the eastern coast of Buenos Aires Province in eastern Argentina. It lies south of Samborombón Bay.

This Cape is the southwest limit of the Río de la Plata

There are two notable lighthouses: San Antonio Lighthouse and Punta Médanos Lighthouse.
