= Villarino Partido =

Villarino Partido de Villarino
- Department
- location of Villarino Partido in Buenos Aires Province
- Coordinates: 38°49′S 62°42′W
- Country: Argentina
- Established: July 28, 1886
- Founder: provincial law
- Seat: Médanos

Government
  - Intendant: Carlos Bevilacqua (ApV)

Area
  - Total: 11,400 km^{2} (4,400 sq mi)

Population
  - Total: 26,517
  - Density: 2.33/km^{2} (6.02/sq mi)
- Demonym: villarinense
- Postal Code: B8132
- IFAM: BUE133
- Area Code: 02927
- Website: www.villarino.gov.ar

Villarino Partido is a partido in the south of Buenos Aires Province in Argentina.

The provincial subdivision has a population of about 26,500 inhabitants in an area of 11,400 km^{2} (4,402 sq mi), and its capital city is Médanos, which is located 735 km (457 mi) from Buenos Aires and that is known for its onion and premium wine production.

== Settlements ==
- Argerich
- Colonia Monte La Plata
- Colonia San Adolfo
- Hilario Ascasubi
- Juan Cousté (Estacion Algarrobo)
- Mayor Buratovich
- Médanos
- Pedro Luro
- Teniente Origone

== Notable people ==
- Mario Davidovsky Musician
