= Campos del Tuyú National Park =

National park in Argentina

- Parque Nacional Campos del Tuyú
- IUCN category II (national park)
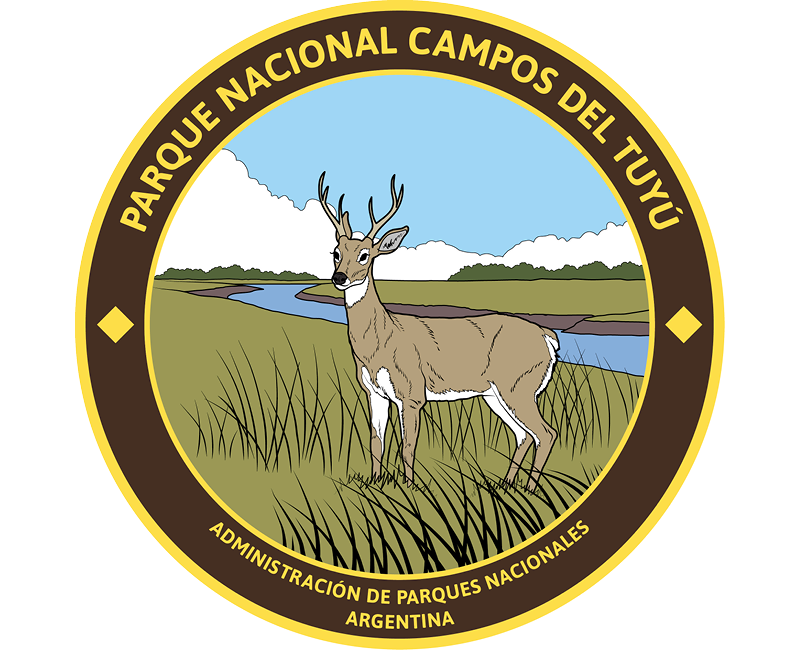
- Emblem of the Campos del Tuyú National Park

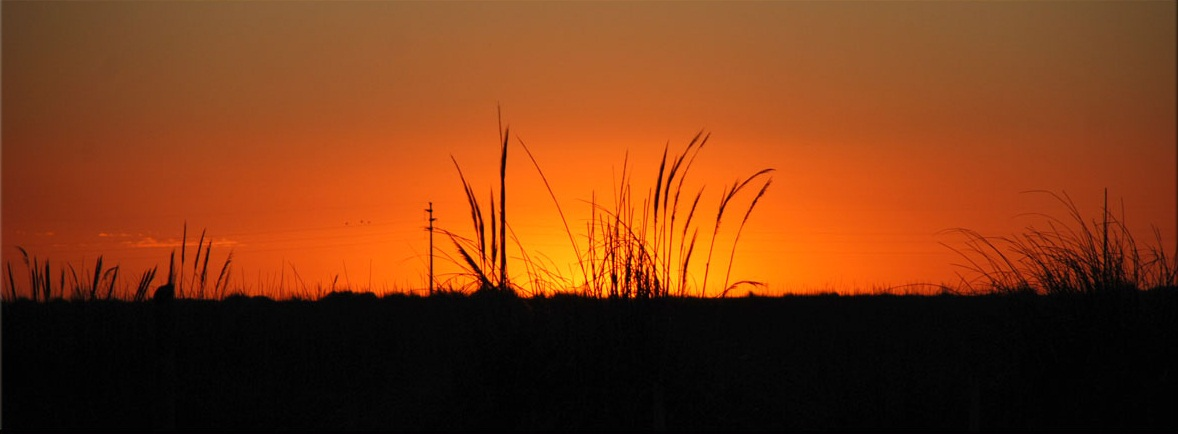
- Atardecer en los Campos del Tuyú

- Location within Argentina
- Location: Buenos Aires Province, Argentina
- Coordinates: 36°21′S 56°52′W
- Area: 3,040 hectares (7,500 acres)
- Established: 2009

Campos del Tuyú National Park (Spanish: Parque Nacional Campos del Tuyú) is a national park in Buenos Aires Province, Argentina. Situated on the southern shore of Samborombón Bay, the park was established on May 13, 2009. The main attraction of Campos del Tuyú is the rare pampas deer; in fact, it is one of the few places in the Pampas where this species survive. Other inhabitants of the park include the Geoffroy's cat (Leopardus geoffroyi), capybara and over a hundred bird species.
