= Buenos Aires wines =

The Buenos Aires Province has become a producer of premium wines during the first decade of the 21st century. Vineyards are located at the southern part of the province, specially around Médanos. The activity was pioneered in lands previously dedicated to garlic and pastures. Wine from Médanos won a Silver Medal in the 2009 Decanter World Wine Awards, the world's largest wine contest celebrated in London.

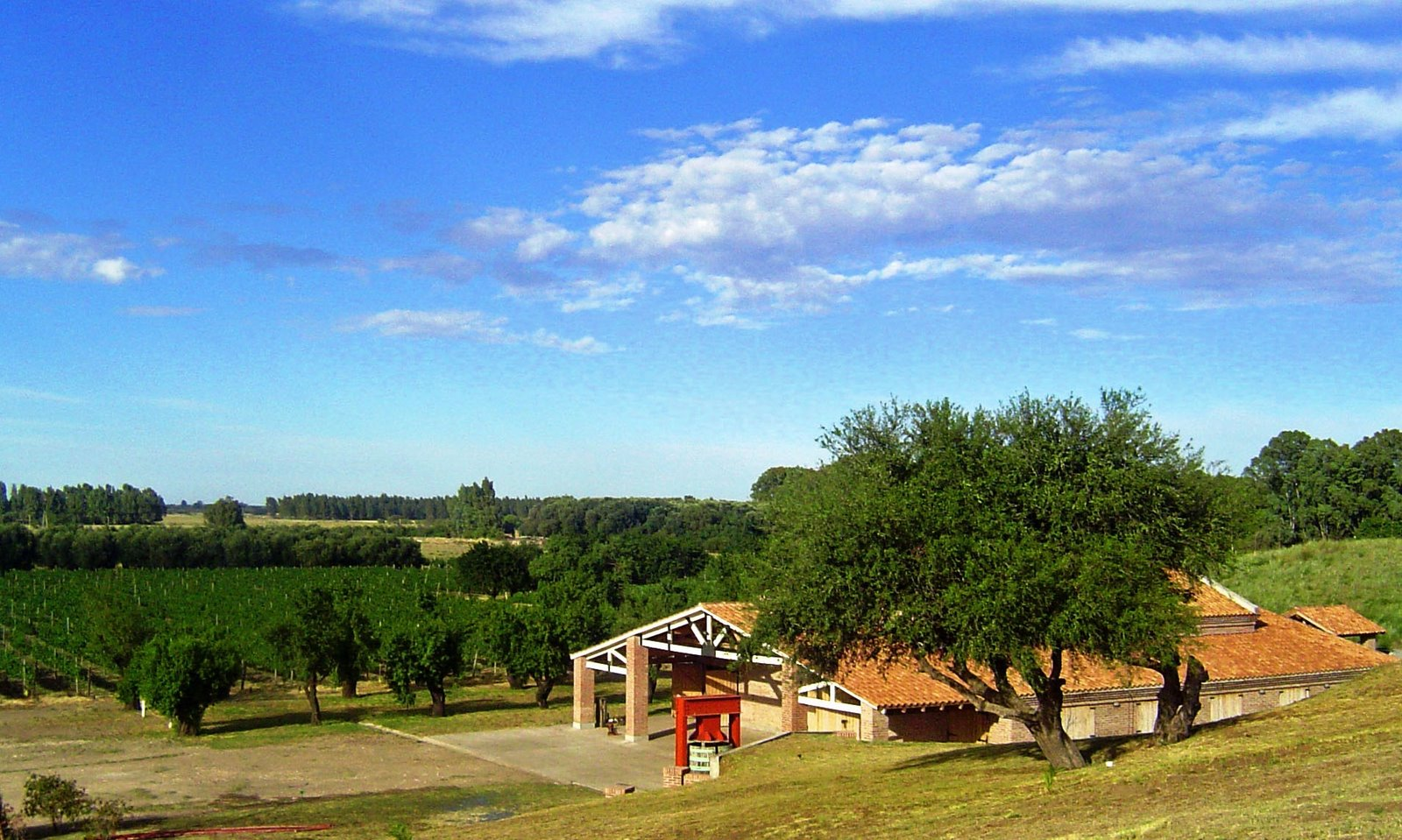
Al Este Bodega y Viñedos vineyards and winery in Médanos

== Climate and geography ==
The Médanos terroir has unique conditions ideal for quality vineyards. The soil is sandy, and given its latitude (around parallel 39° South, where the Pampa region and Patagonia converge) vineyards receive long hours of sun light, which result in grapes with high sugar contents. Windy springs help develop thicker skins that contribute to the intense color of these wines.

The new Argentine wine-producing area is located far east from traditional vineyards which are grown at the west of the country, mostly near the Andes range.

== Wine regions ==
Médanos appellation is a geographic indication applied to wines produced in Médanos (Buenos Aires, Argentina) whose characteristics are a function and a direct result of the geographic area and the terroir in which the grapes are grown and the wines are produced and aged.

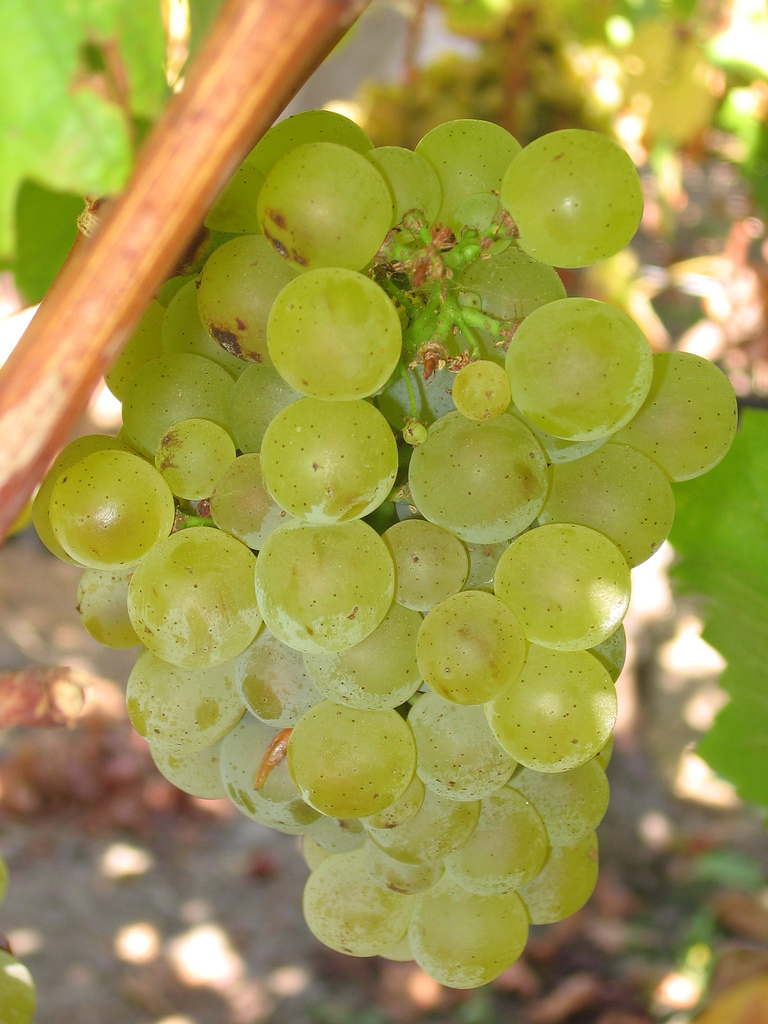
Sauvignon blanc grapes

Médanos appellation wines include:

- Malbec
- Sauvignon blanc
- Cabernet Sauvignon
- Cabernet Franc
- Tannat
- Chardonnay
- Petit Verdot
- Tempranillo

Given its proximity to the ocean, the Médanos terroir consists of sandy soil over a limestone plate with long sun hours and a resulting high termic amplitude during the day.

Médanos is the only Argentine terroir dedicated to production of premium wines with oceanic influence.

The closeness to the ocean and the strong winds in the area develop thick skins in the grapes that contribute to complex wines with intense colors.

== See also ==
- Medanos (appellation)
- Al Este Bodega y Viñedos
- Domaine Al Este
