= Samborombón River =

River of Argentina

Coordinates: 35°43′0″S 57°20′50″W

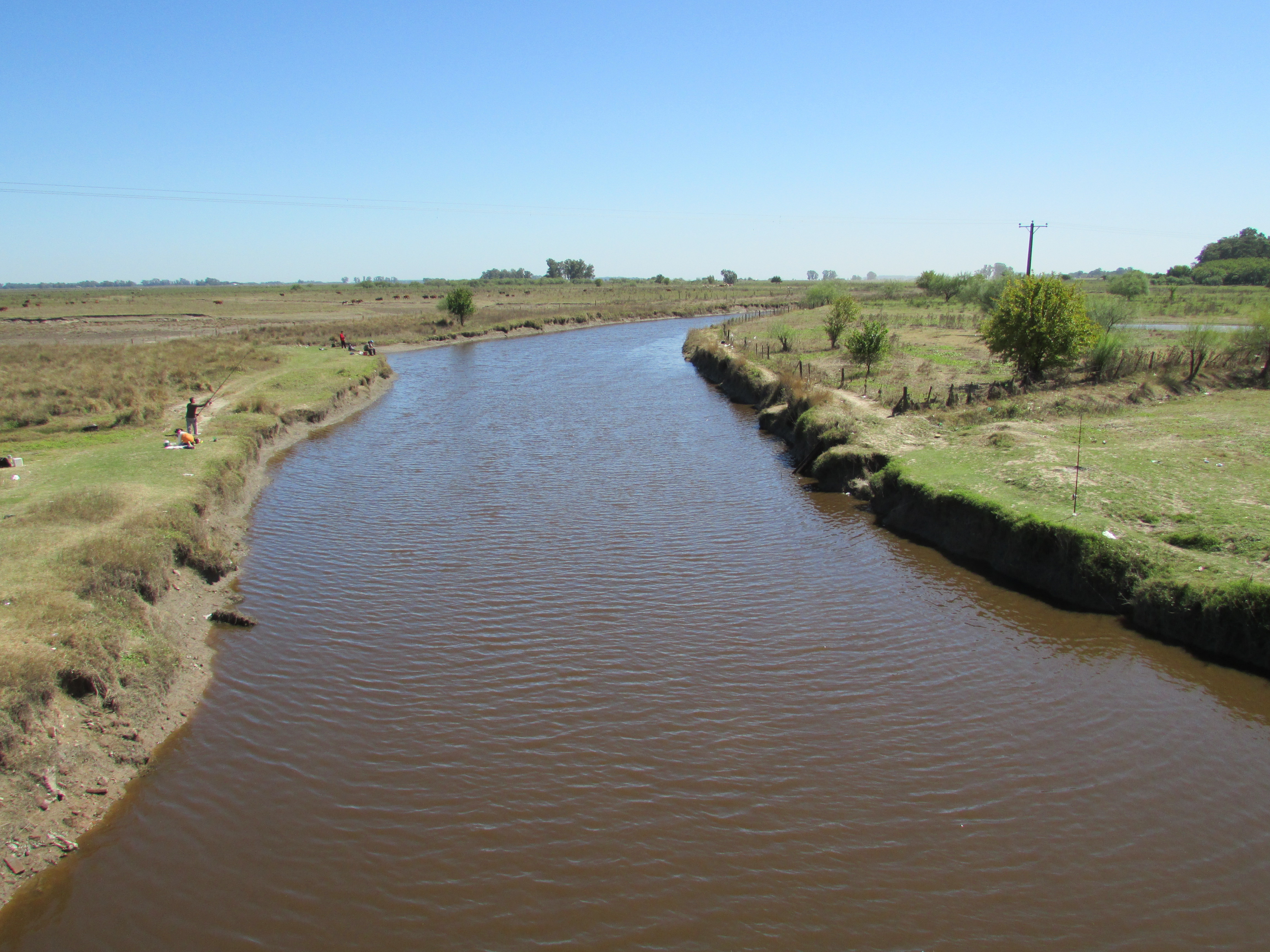

Location
- Country: Argentina

Physical characteristics
- Mouth
  - location: Samborombón Bay

The Samborombón River (Spanish, Río Samborombón, literally "Saint Brendan River") is a river of Argentina. It empties into Samborombón Bay in the southern part of the Río de la Plata.

== See also ==
- List of rivers of Argentina
