= Médanos, Buenos Aires =

Médanos
- Location in Argentina
- Coordinates: 38°49′S 62°40′W
- Country: Argentina
- Province: Buenos Aires
- Partido: Villarino
- Founded: December 16, 1832
- Elevation: 33 m (108 ft)

Population (2001 census [INDEC])
  - Total: 5,447
- CPA Base: B 8132
- Area code: +54 2927

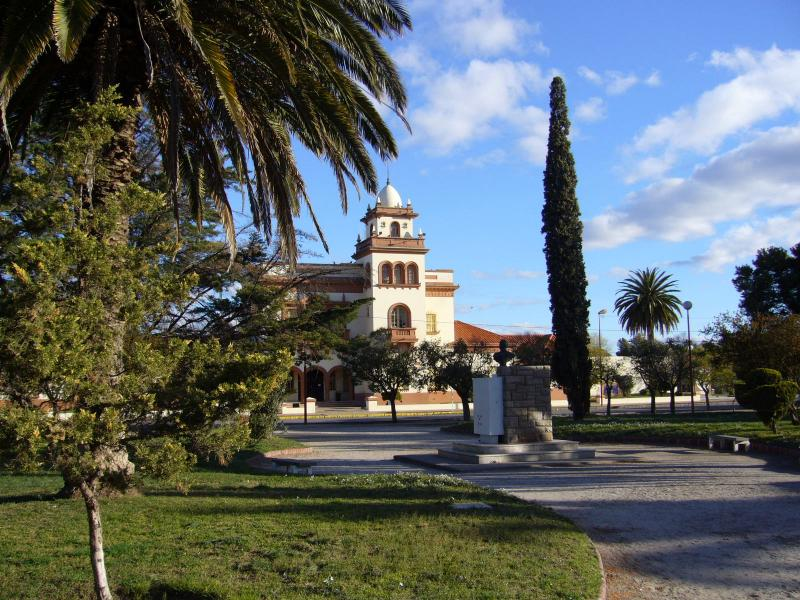
Villarino Municipal building

Médanos is a town in Buenos Aires Province, Argentina. The town hosts the "Fiesta Nacional del Ajo" (National Garlic Festival) and is located in the Buenos Aires wines area. It is the administrative seat of Villarino Partido.
