= Buenos Aires Province =

Province of Argentina

Buenos Aires
- Province
- Province of Buenos Aires; Provincia de Buenos Aires (Spanish)
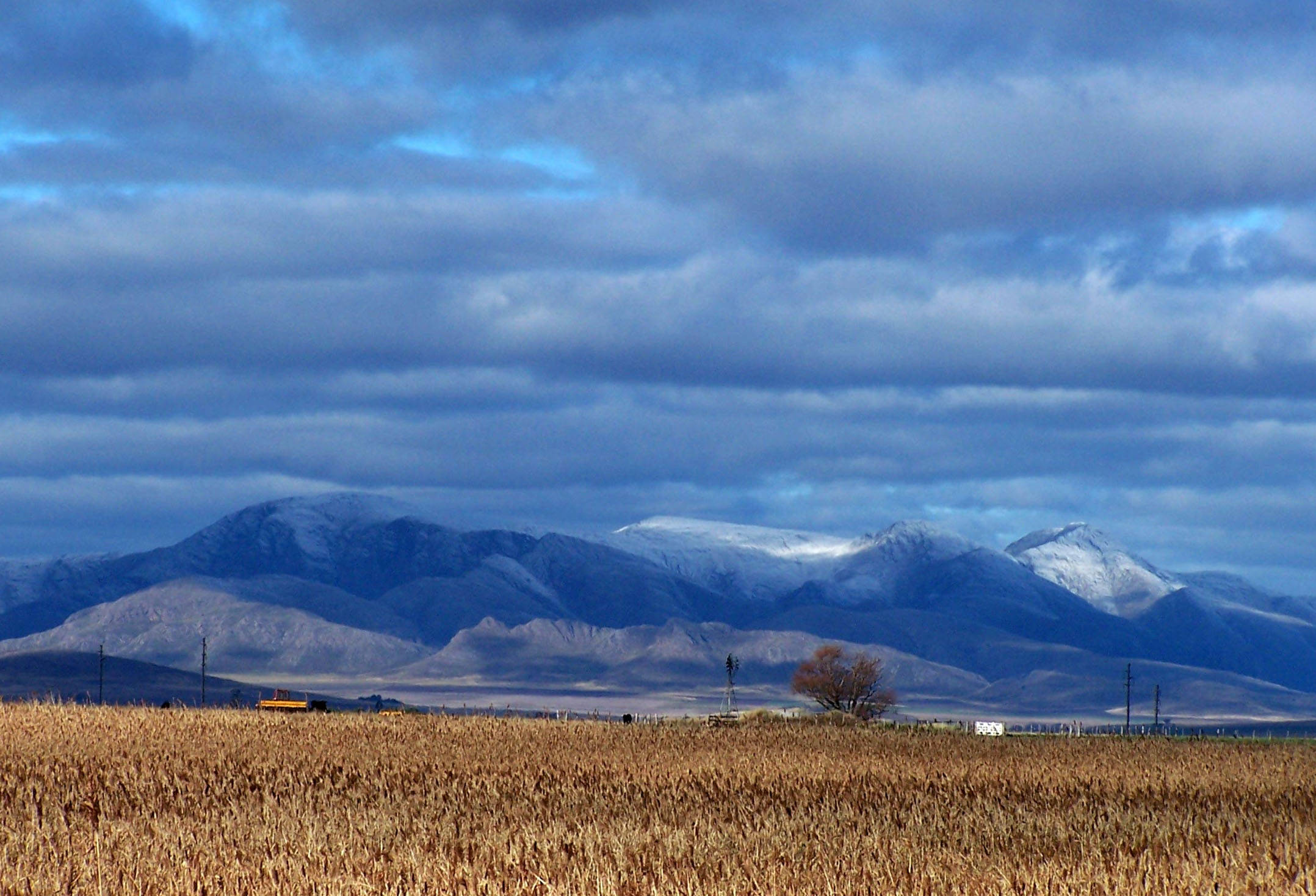
- View of Tres Picos Hill

- Flag Coat of arms

- Location of Buenos Aires Province within Argentina
- Coordinates: 37°S 60°W
- Country: Argentina
- Capital: La Plata

Government
  - Governor: Axel Kicillof (PJ-UxP)
  - Vice Governor: Verónica Magario (PJ-UxP)
  - Legislature: Chamber of Deputies (92); Senate (46)
  - National Deputies: 70
  - National Senators: Maximiliano Abad (UCR); Eduardo de Pedro (PJ); Juliana Di Tullio (PJ)

Area Ranked 1st
  - Total: 307,571 km^{2} (118,754 sq mi)

Population (2022 census)
  - Total: 17,569,053
  - Rank: 1st
  - Density: 57.1219/km^{2} (147.945/sq mi)
- Demonym: bonaerense

GDP
  - Total: peso 7,573 billion (US$162 billion) (2019)
- Time zone: UTC−03:00 (ART)
- Postal codes: B1601XXX to B8512XXX
- ISO 3166 code: AR-B
- HDI (2021): 0.842 very high (11th)
- Website: www.gba.gob.ar

Buenos Aires, (Note: Spanish pronunciation: [ˈbwenos ˈajɾes]) officially the Province of Buenos Aires, (Note: Provincia de Buenos Aires Spanish pronunciation: [pɾoˈβinsja ðe ˈβwenos ˈajɾes]) is the largest and most populous Argentine province. It takes its name from the city of Buenos Aires, the capital of the country, which used to be part of the province and the province's capital until it was federalized in 1880. Since then, in spite of bearing the same name, the province does not include Buenos Aires city, though it does include all other parts of the Greater Buenos Aires metropolitan region, which include approximately three-fourths of the conurbation's population. The capital of the province is the city of La Plata, founded in 1882.

It is bordered by the provinces of Entre Ríos to the northeast, Santa Fe to the north, Córdoba to the northwest, La Pampa to the west, Río Negro to the south and west and the Autonomous City of Buenos Aires to the northeast. Uruguay is just across the Rio de la Plata to the northeast, and both are on the coast of the Atlantic Ocean to the east. Almost the entire province is part of the Pampas geographical region, with the extreme south considered part of the Patagonia region.

The province has a population of about 17.5 million people, which is 38% of Argentina's total population. The province covers an area of 307,571 km^{2} (118,754 sq mi), which is about 11% of Argentina's total area and makes it the country's largest province.

== History ==
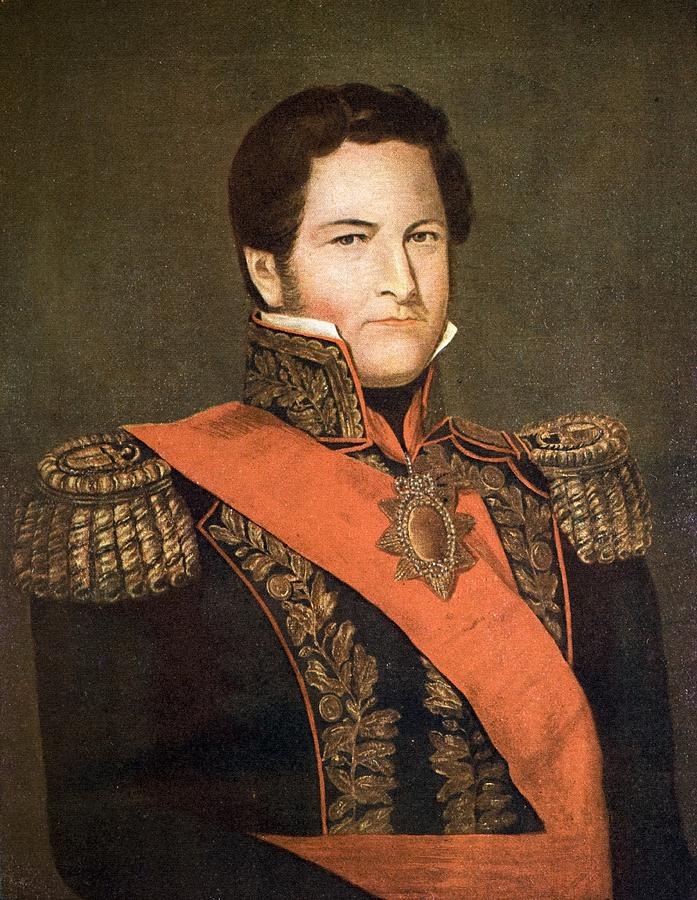
Governor Juan Manuel de Rosas (1841 oil portrait by Cayetano Descalzi) ruled until 1852 with an iron fist and kept the fragile Confederation under the tutelage of Buenos Aires Province

The inhabitants of the province before the 16th-century advent of Spanish colonization were aboriginal peoples such as the Charrúas and the Querandíes. Their culture was lost over the next 350 years. They were subjected to Eurasian plagues from which few survived. The survivors joined other tribes or have been mostly absorbed by Argentina's European immigration.

Pedro de Mendoza founded Santa María del Buen Ayre in 1536. Even though the first contact with the aboriginals was peaceful, it soon became hostile. The city was evacuated in 1541. Juan de Garay re-founded the settlement in 1580 as Santísima Trinidad y Puerto Santa María de Los Buenos Aires.

Amidst ongoing conflict with the aboriginals, the cattle farms extended from Buenos Aires, whose port was always the center of the economy of the territory. Following the creation of the Viceroyalty of the Río de la Plata at the end of the 18th century, the export of meat, leather and their derivatives through the port of Buenos Aires was the basis of the economic development of the region.

Jesuits unsuccessfully tried to peacefully assimilate the aboriginals into the European culture brought by the Spanish conquistadores. A certain balance was found at the end of the 18th century when the Salado River became the limit between both civilizations, despite frequent malones (aboriginal attacks on border settlements). The end to this situation came in 1879 with the Conquest of the Desert (Conquista del Desierto) in which the aboriginals were almost completely exterminated.

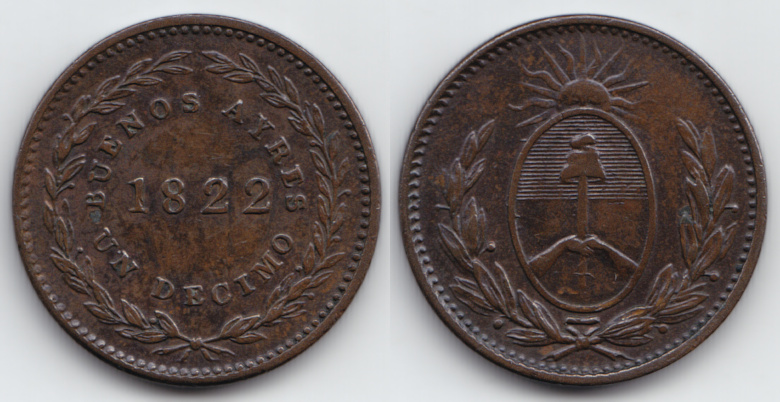
1 decimo coin minted for the province in 1822. The reverse features the provincial coat of arms

After the independence from Spain in 1816, the city and province of Buenos Aires became the focus of an intermittent Argentine Civil War with other provinces. A Federal Pact secured by Governor Juan Manuel de Rosas in 1831 led to the establishment of the Argentine Confederation and to his gaining the sum of public power, which provided a tenuous unity. Ongoing disputes regarding the influence of Buenos Aires, between Federalists and Unitarians, and over the Port of Buenos Aires (the prime source of public revenue at the time) fueled periodic hostilities. The province was declared independent on 11 September 1852, as the State of Buenos Aires. Concessions gained in 1859 Pact of San José de Flores and a victory at the Battle of Pavón led to its reincorporation into the Argentine Republic on 17 December 1861. Intermittent conflicts with the nation did not truly cease until 1880, when the city of Buenos Aires was formally federalized and, thus, administratively separated from the province.

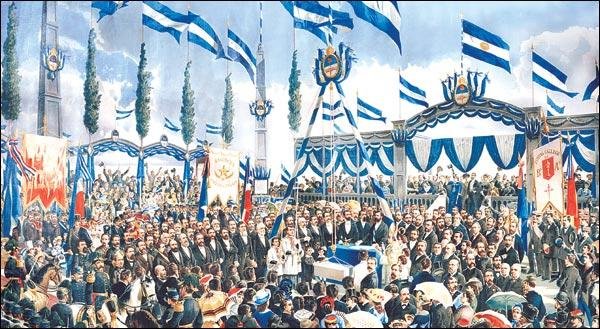
Period illustration of the 1882 placement of La Plata's foundation stone

La Plata was founded in 1882 by Governor Dardo Rocha for the purpose of becoming the provincial capital. The equivalent of a billion (1880s) dollars of British investment and pro-development, education and immigration policies pursued at the national level subsequently spurred dramatic economic growth. Driven by European immigration and improved health, the province's population, like Argentina's, nearly doubled to one million by 1895 and doubled again by 1914. Rail lines connected nearly every town and hamlet in the province by 1914; many developed around the new railway stations.

This era of accelerated development was cut short by the Wall Street crash of 1929, which caused a sharp drop in commodity prices (99% of Argentine exports were agricultural) and led to a halt in the flow of investment funds between nations. The new Concordance and Perón governments funded ambitious lending and public works programs, visible in Buenos Aires Province through the panoply of levees, power plants, water works, paved roads, municipal buildings, and (particularly during Perón's 1946–55 tenure) schools, clinics and massive regional hospitals.

The province's population, after 1930, began to grow disproportionately quickly in the suburban areas of Buenos Aires. These suburbs had grown to include 4 million out of the province's total 7 million people in 1960. Much of the area these new suburbs were developed on (particularly the poorer ones) consisted of wetlands and were prone to flooding. To address this, Governor Oscar Alende initiated the province's most important flood-control project to date, the Roggero Reservoir. Completed a decade later, in 1971, the reservoir and associated electric and water-treatment facilities encouraged still more, and more orderly, development of the Greater Buenos Aires region, which today includes around 10 million people (2/3 of the provincial population). It did not address worsening pollution resulting from the area's industrial growth, which had made itself evident since around 1920. This problem has been at its worst along the Reconquista River west and north of the city of Buenos Aires; over 4 million people (one in 10 Argentines) today live on the Reconquista's basin. Of these, about a million still live with seriously compromised water quality, despite the province's (sometimes counterproductive) efforts to remedy the issue.

=== Contemporary history ===
In April 2013, the northeastern section of Buenos Aires Province, particularly its capital, La Plata, experienced several flash floods that claimed the lives of at least 89 people.

Alejandro Armendáriz, of the Radical Civic Union, was elected governor in 1983, when Raúl Alfonsín became president. Alfonsín lost the 1987 midterm elections, leading to the victory of Antonio Cafiero. From then to 2015, all governors have been Peronists. The high population of the province makes it highly influential in Argentine politics. With both ruling for two terms, the rivalry of the president Carlos Menem and governor Eduardo Duhalde dominated the Argentine politics during the nineties. A similar case took place with the president Cristina Fernández de Kirchner and governor Daniel Scioli. María Eugenia Vidal, from Republican Proposal, won the 2015 elections, and became the first female governor of the province.

=== Paleontology ===
In February 2021, researchers led by paleontologist Nicolás Chimento of the Museo Argentino de Ciencias Naturales announced the discovery of a well-preserved fossilized skull of the giant ground sloth Megatherium near San Eduardo del Mar, Province of Buenos Aires. According to paleontologists, the fossil belonged to a juvenile and dated back approximately 3.58 million years.

== Government ==
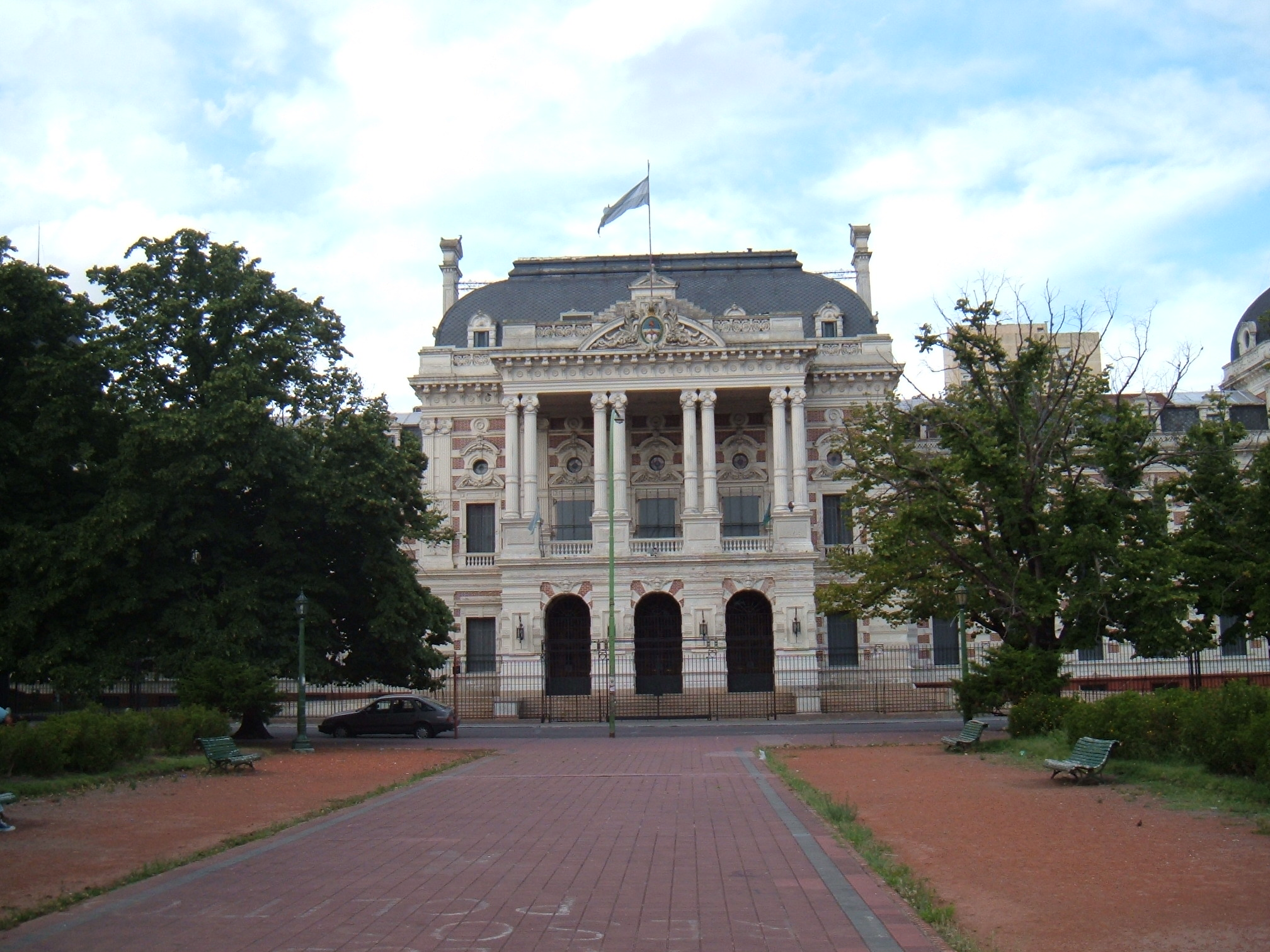
Provincial Government House in La Plata

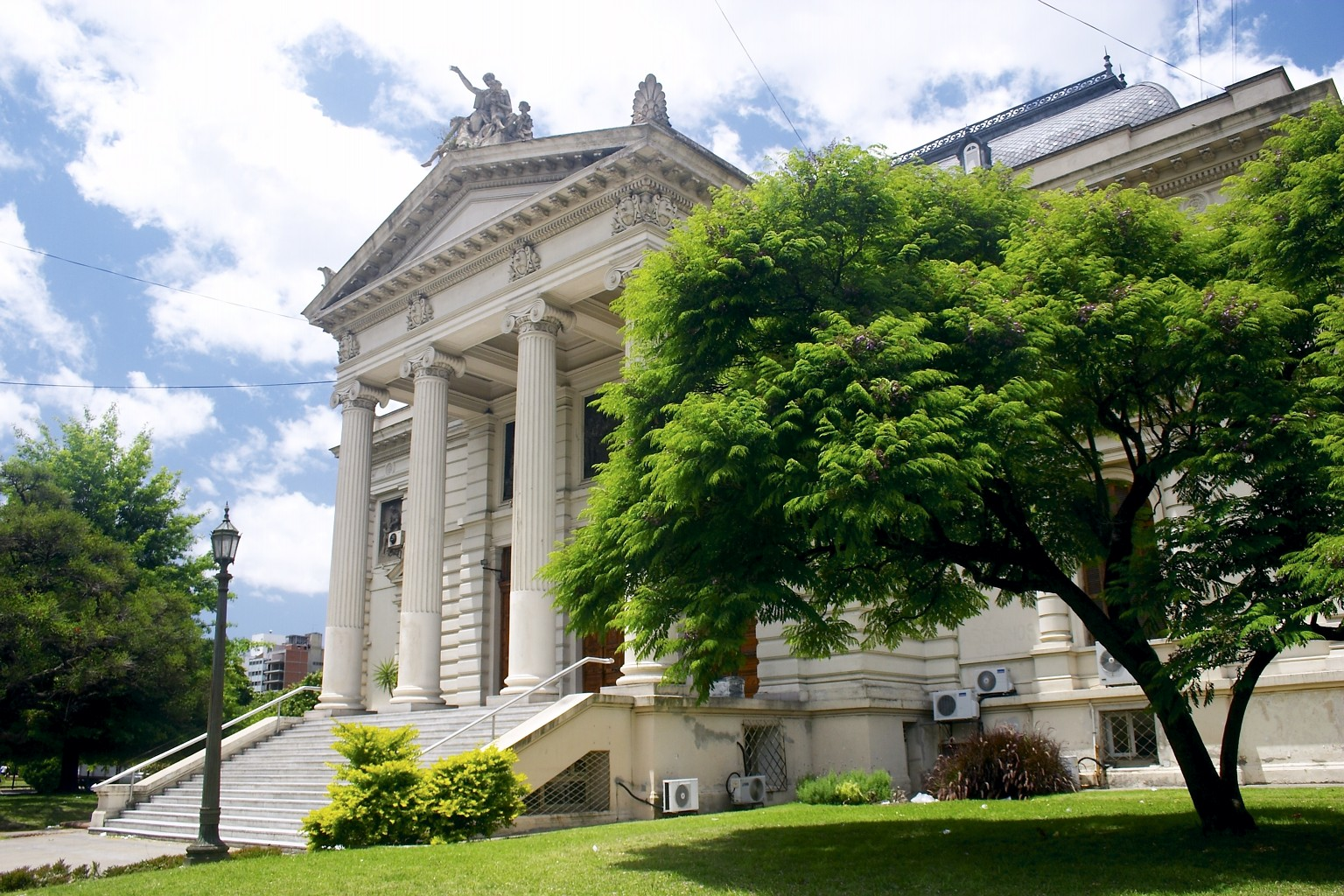
Provincial Legislature in La Plata

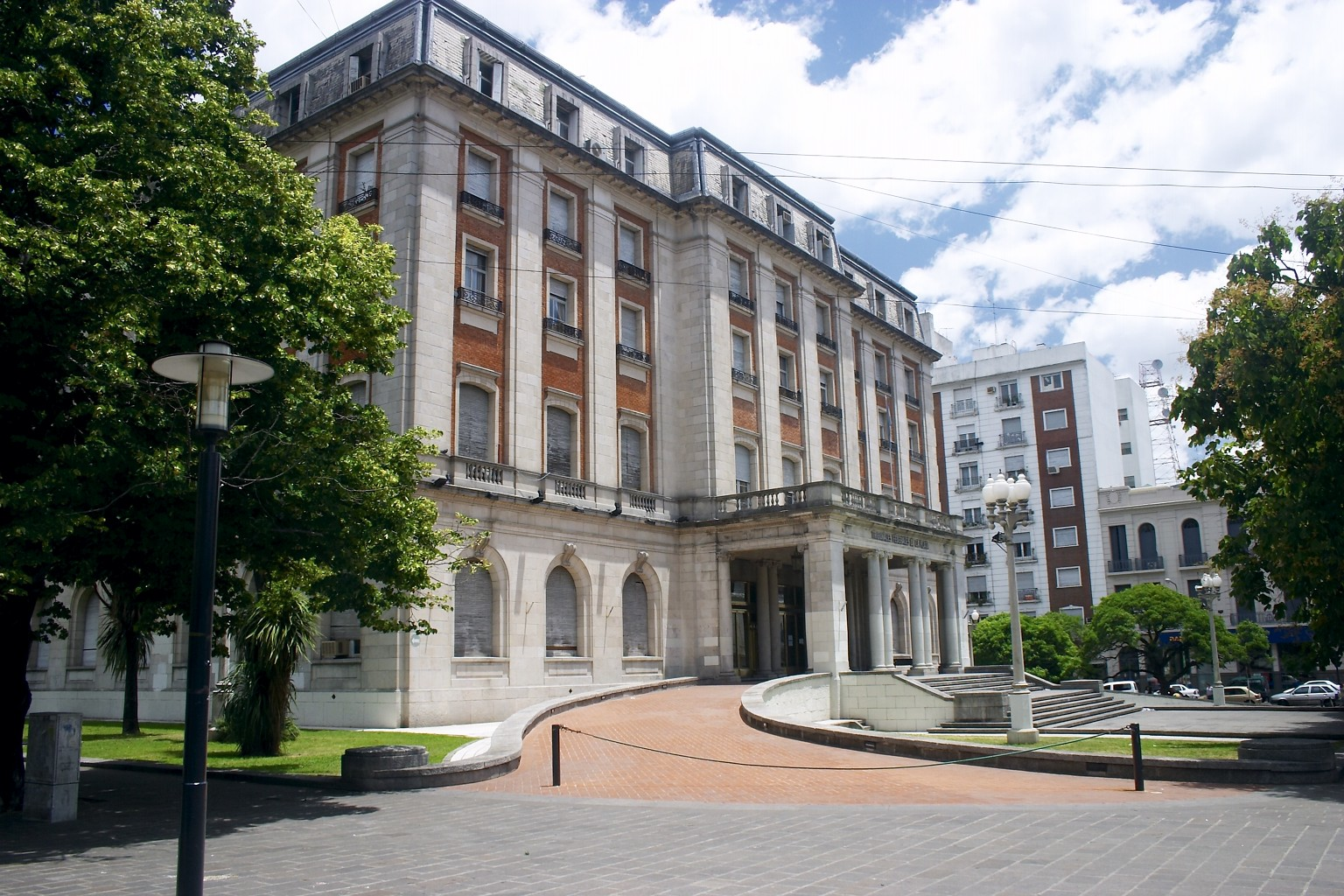
Federal courts in La Plata

The provincial government is divided into three branches: the executive, headed by a popularly elected governor, who appoints the cabinet; the legislative (represented by the Legislature, which is split into the Chamber of Deputies and the Senate); and the judiciary, headed by the Supreme Court.

The Constitution of Buenos Aires Province forms the formal law of the province.

In Argentina, the most important law enforcement organization is the Argentine Federal Police, but the province is policed by its own Buenos Aires Provincial Police.

== Geography ==
Buenos Aires Province, at 307,571 square kilometres (118,754 sq mi), is slightly bigger than Italy. The landscape is mainly flat, with two low mountain ranges: Sierra de la Ventana (near Bahía Blanca) and Sierra de Tandil (Tandil). The highest point is Cerro Tres Picos (1,239 m (4,065 ft) amsl; 38°8′S 61°58′W) and the longest river is Río Salado (700 km (435 mi) long).

As part of The Pampas, the weather of the province is strongly influenced by the ocean, with hot summers and temperate winters. Humidity is high and precipitation is abundant and distributed over the year. The Western and Southwestern regions are drier and are part of the Semi-arid Pampas ecoregion. The southernmost part of the province is often included in definitions of the Patagonia region.

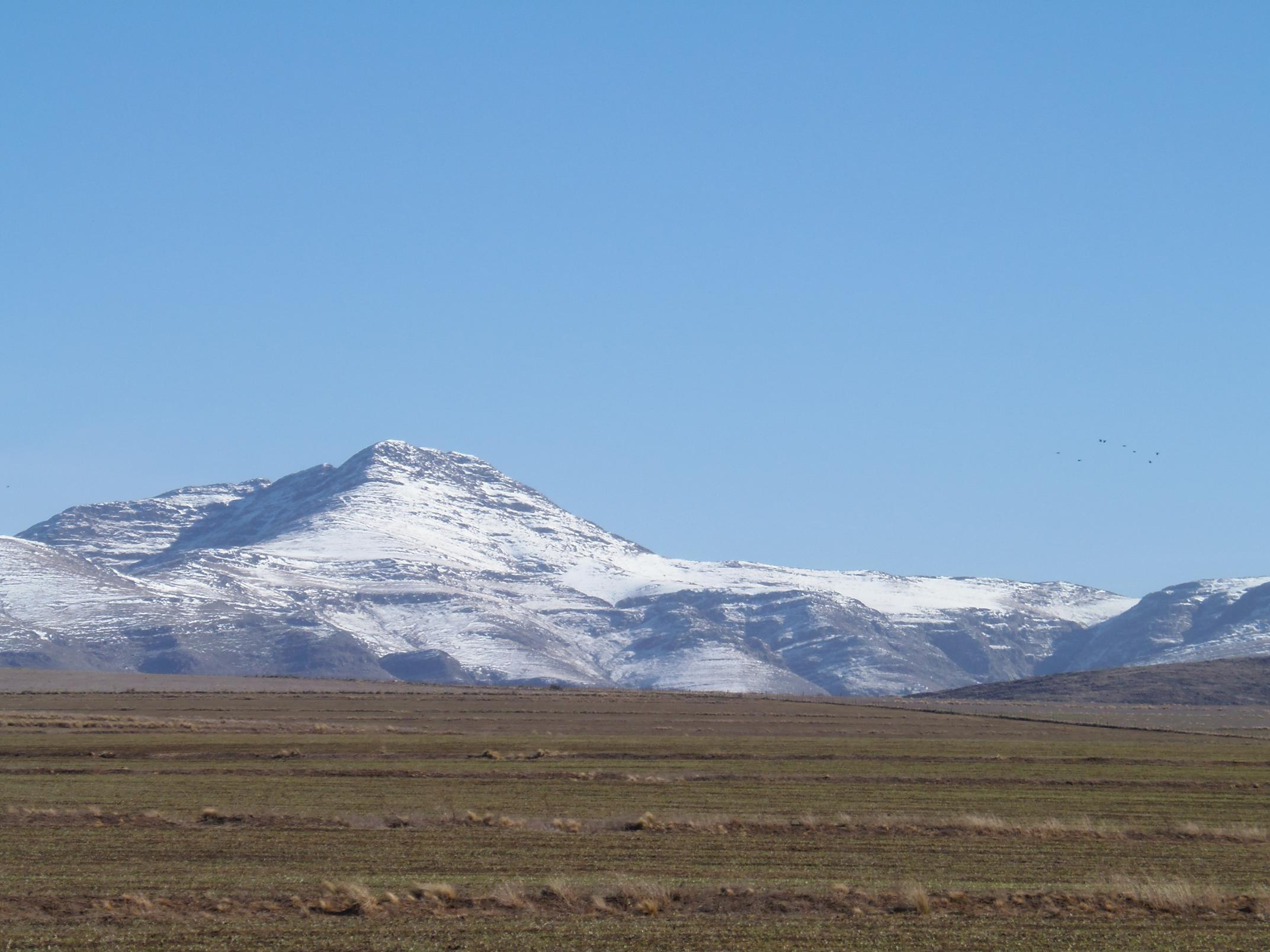
The Sierra de la Ventana

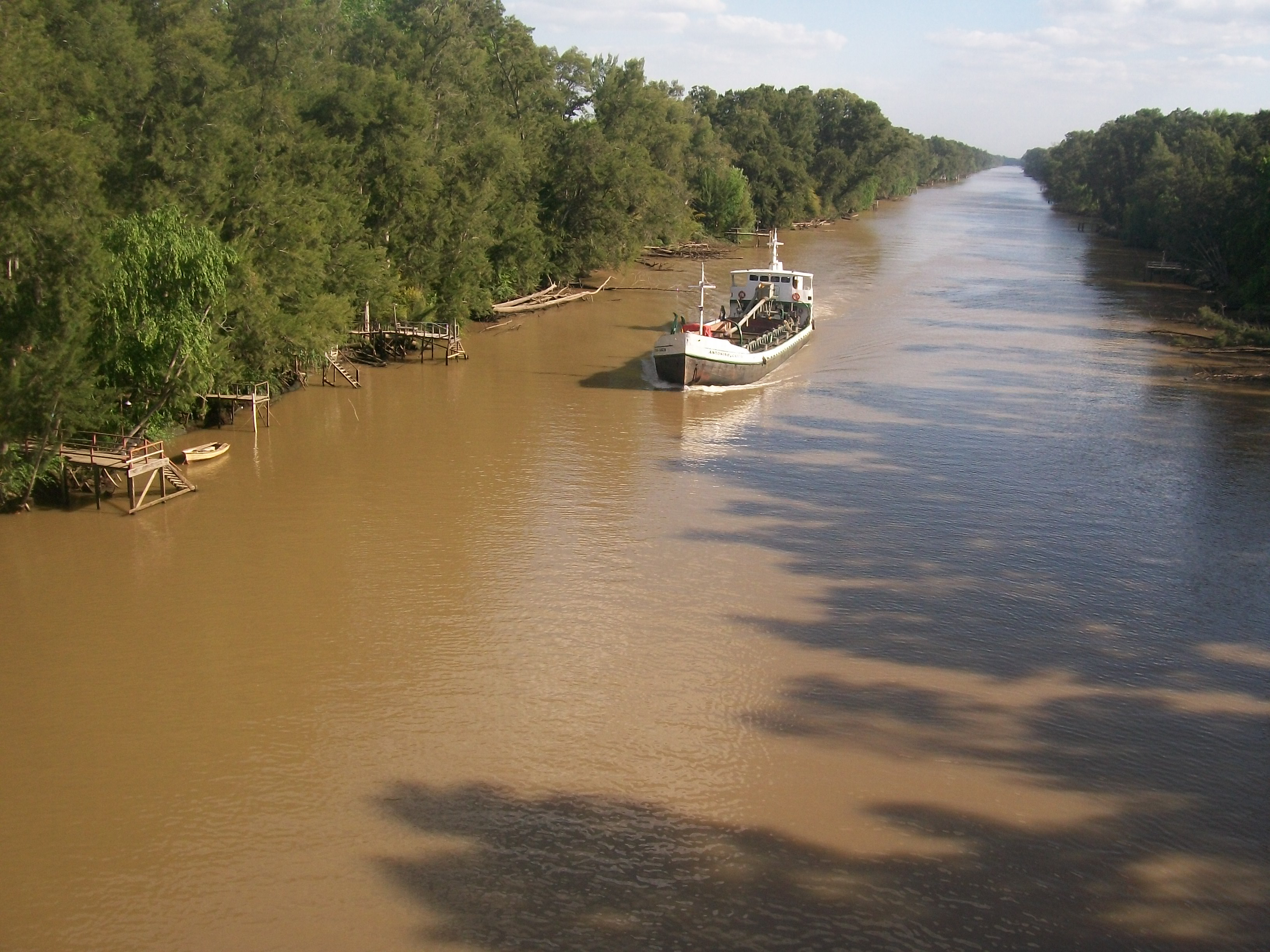
The Arias Canal in the Paraná Delta

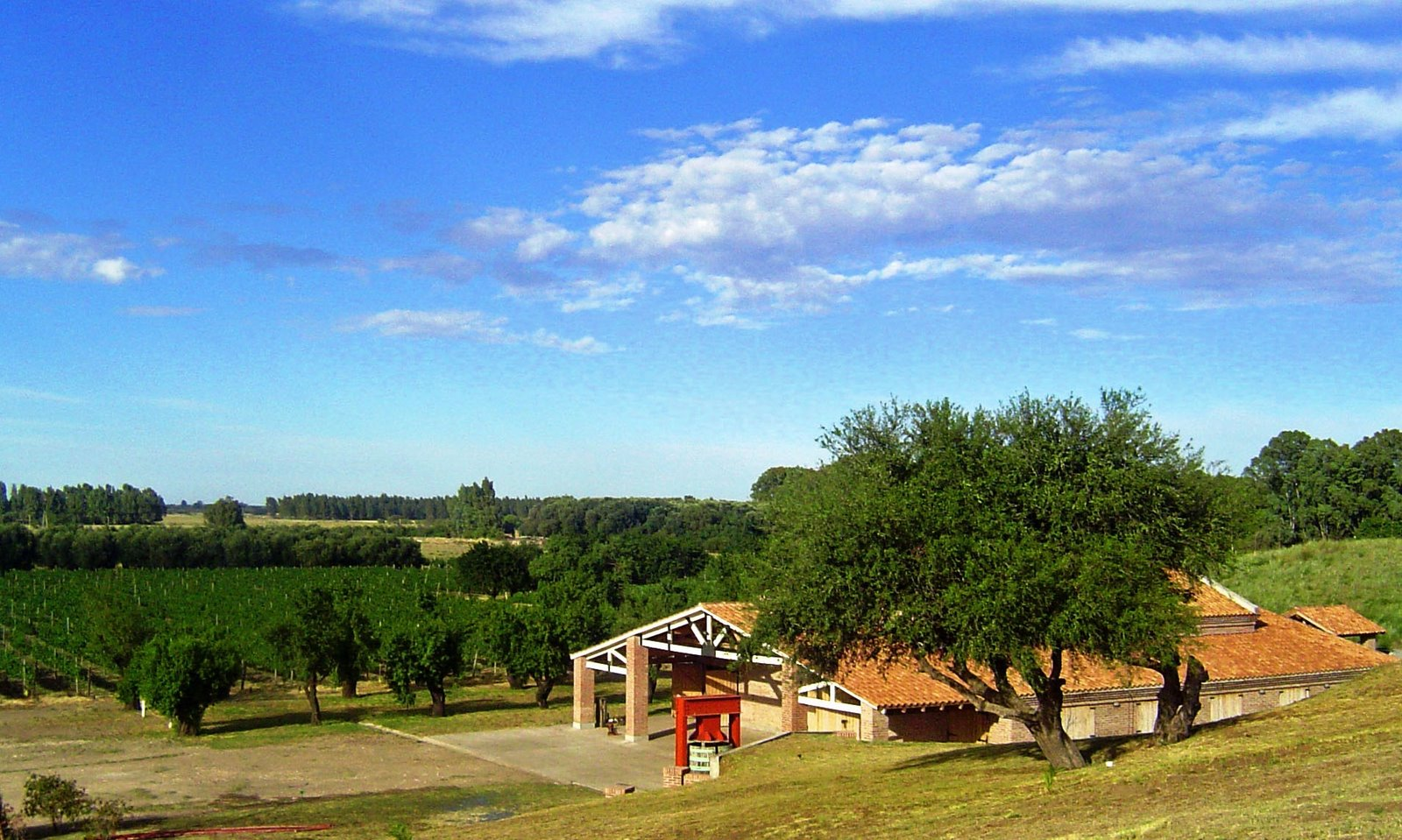
Al Este Bodega y Viñedos in Médanos, located on the southern tip of Buenos Aires Province 40 km (25 mi) away from Bahía Blanca

=== Climate ===
Köppen climate map of Buenos Aires

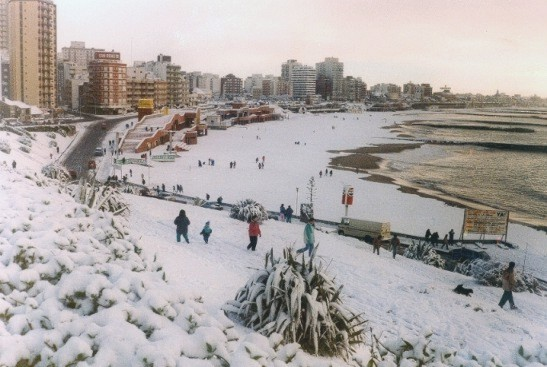
Snow on La Perla beach, Mar del Plata (1991)

The climate of the province of Buenos Aires is extremely benign for human activities: it is temperate, with four marked seasons and reliable rainfall on most regions. The province can be divided into four main climatic regions: the southwestern, drier region; the cool Atlantic region; the northern and eastern humid region, and the Delta region, with the warmest, wettest climate.

The northern region has warm, humid summers, with days between 28 and 32 °C (82 and 90 °F) and nights between 16 and 20 °C (61 and 68 °F), pleasant falls, cool, drier winters with highs between 13 and 18 °C (55 and 64 °F) and nights between 2 and 5 °C (36 and 41 °F), and windy, variable springs. Heat waves may bring days with temperatures over 38 °C (100 °F), but these do not usually last very long, as cold fronts bring thunderstorms and cooler days, with night temperatures often falling down to 12 °C (54 °F). Winter cold waves may bring days with highs about 8 °C (46 °F), and lows below −4 °C (25 °F), with extremes down to −8 °C (18 °F). Snow is uncommon, but there have been accumulations on several occasions in the past. Precipitation ranges from 750 to 1,100 mm (30 to 43 in) per year.

The Delta region is slightly warmer, especially at night, due to the presence of water and the northerly location. Summer nights tend to be stickier, and winters can be damp and foggy, with most nights between 4 and 8 °C (39 and 46 °F). Frost is still to be expected, but temperatures will almost never fall below −4 °C (25 °F), and snow has fallen only twice in the last century. Precipitation ranges from 1,000 to 1,300 mm (39 to 51 in) and falls throughout the year. The city of Buenos Aires is surrounded by a climate similar to the northern part of the province, but the city itself resembles more the Delta climate, with less frost.

The southwestern region is the driest region, and it experiences a more marked differences in temperatures. Summers are often hot, between 30 and 35 °C (86 and 95 °F), but nights are usually comfortable (14 to 18 °C (57 to 64 °F)). Thunderstorms are less frequent but can be very violent in nature. Frost can make an appearance as early as March, but usually first comes in April. Winters are cool and dry, with days between 10 and 16 °C (50 and 61 °F) and nights between −1 and 4 °C (30 and 39 °F). Frost occurs on an almost daily basis, with temperatures below −6 °C (21 °F) not uncommon, and down to −12 °C (10 °F) recorded in some areas. Snowfall may occur every once in a while, but accumulations are usually small. Total precipitation ranges from 500 to 750 mm (20 to 30 in), with slightly rainier springs and falls.

The Atlantic region sees very moderate weather: the ocean is cold (17 to 20 °C (63 to 68 °F) in the summer) and sea breezes often bring chilly weather until midsummer. The hottest months average 25 to 27 °C (77 to 81 °F) with nights between 12 and 16 °C (54 and 61 °F), providing a perfect relief for the inhabitants of the hotter interior. Fall is often rainy, and winters can be windy and chilly: temperatures average from 10 to 15 °C (50 to 59 °F), and nights from 1 to 5 °C (34 to 41 °F). There can be long periods of drizzly weather and constant temperatures of about 7 °C (45 °F). Frost is common but temperatures will rarely fall below −5 °C (23 °F), and snowfalls sometimes, but accumulations are only to be expected every few years. Precipitation ranges from 700 to 950 mm (28 to 37 in). The Sierras de la Ventana (up to 1,200 metres (3,900 ft)) experience cooler weather, especially at night.

The geography of the province is crossed by occasional west Pampero winds. The southern Sudestada produces storms and temperature drops, most notably the Santa Rosa storm, which takes place every year almost exactly on 30 August.

== Administrative divisions ==
Boundaries of the 135 partidos of Buenos Aires Province

Unlike the other provinces of the country, in the province of Buenos Aires, the territorial divisions are called partidos, instead of departments.

These also constitute the municipal division of the province. The provincial Constitution does not recognize the municipal autonomy that was recognized for the whole country in the reform of the National Constitution of 1994. Each partido corresponds to a municipality and is governed by a mayor (intendente) elected by popular vote. The process of creating a partido is much more dynamic than in the other provinces, with a total of six more partidos in 2000 than in 1990. Most of the newer partidos were created in the Greater Buenos Aires. There are 135 partidos, the last established by law is Lezama (2009).

== Demographics ==
=== Population ===
Buenos Aires Province is the most populated province of the country. The INDEC estimates that the population of Buenos Aires Province was 17,541,141 on 1 July 2020, a 12.26% increase since the 2010 national census. According to that census, there were 15 million inhabitants (38% of the national population), of which 12 million lived in Greater Buenos Aires and 3 million in the rest of the province. Around 33.8% of the inhabitants weren't born in the province, of whom 3,918,552 are migrants from other provinces and 758,640 were born abroad.

Evolution of population

Year	Pop.	±%
1778	33,522 – 43,165	—
1821	200,000	—
1847	320,000	+60.0%
1853	500,000	+56.2%
1869	495,107	−1.0%

Year	Pop.	±%
1895	921,168	+86.1%
1914	2,066,948	+124.4%
1947	4,273,874	+106.8%
1960	6,766,108	+58.3%
1970	8,774,529	+29.7%

Year	Pop.	±%
1980	9,766,030	+11.3%
1991	12,594,974	+29.0%
2001	13,827,203	+9.8%
2010	15,625,084	+13.0%

Most of its inhabitants are descendants from colonial-era settlers and immigrants from Europe who arrived within the 19th and 20th centuries, mostly Italians and Spaniards. A number of suburbs in the province are also home to a large, predominantly mestizo population that began migrating from the country's northern provinces in the mid-20th century to take advantage of growing employment opportunities. These same communities are also home to considerable numbers of more recent migrants from Paraguay and Bolivia.

Buenos Aires (province) population pyramid 2022

=== Largest metropolitan areas ===
Metropolitan area	Population (2010 Census)
Greater Buenos Aires (Note: Shared with the Autonomous City of Buenos Aires.)	13,588,171 (Note: Some 11 million of its population belongs to Buenos Aires Province and almost 3 million to the City of Buenos Aires.)
Greater La Plata	787,294
Mar del Plata	618,989
Greater Bahía Blanca	291,327

=== Largest cities ===
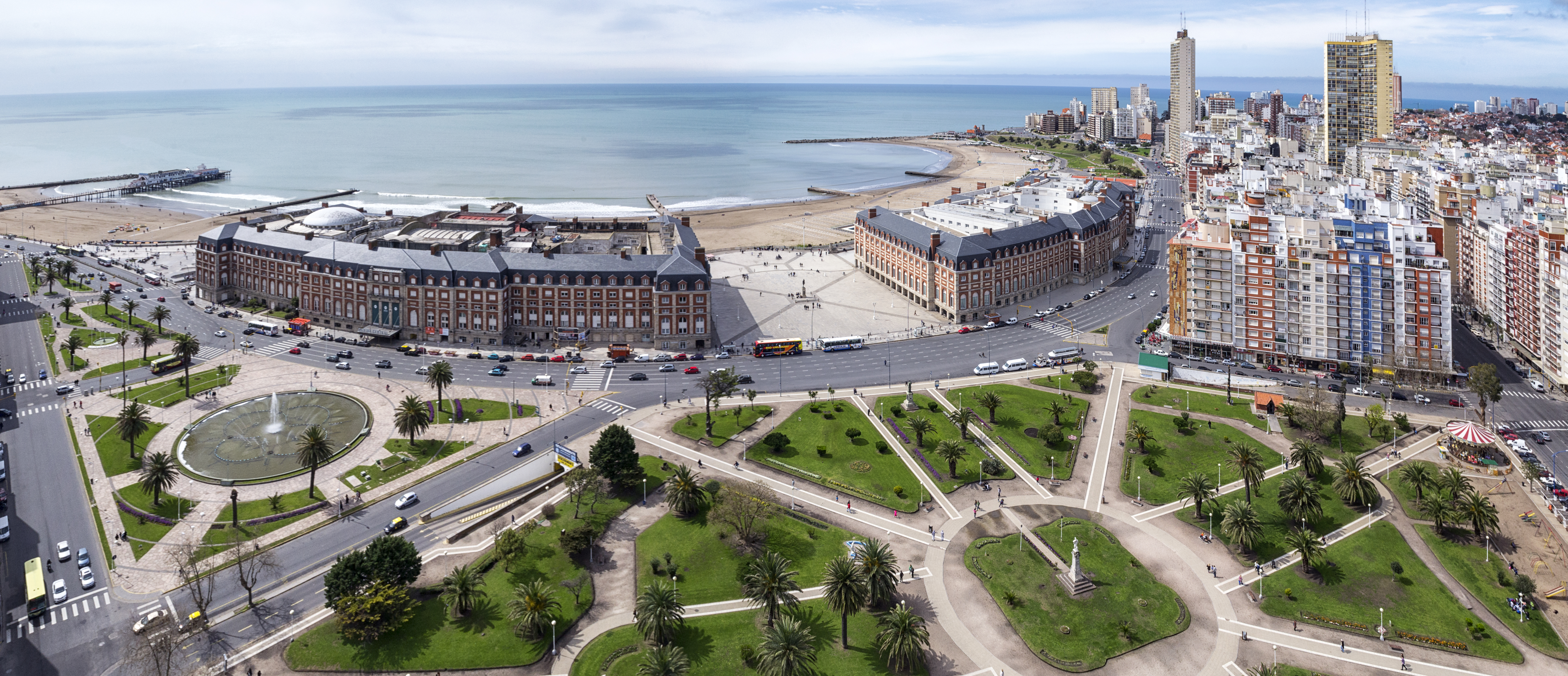
Downtown Mar del Plata

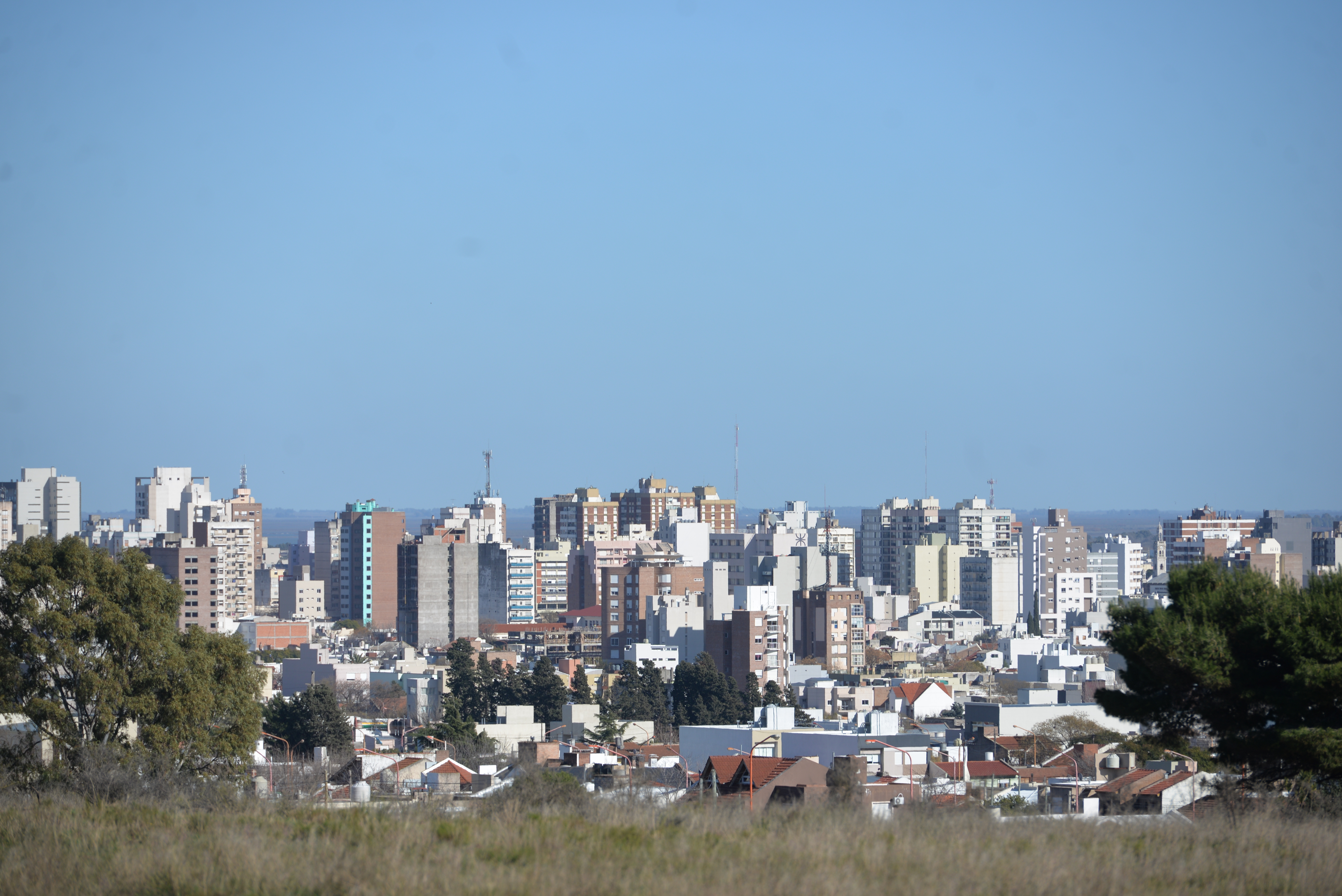
View of Bahía Blanca

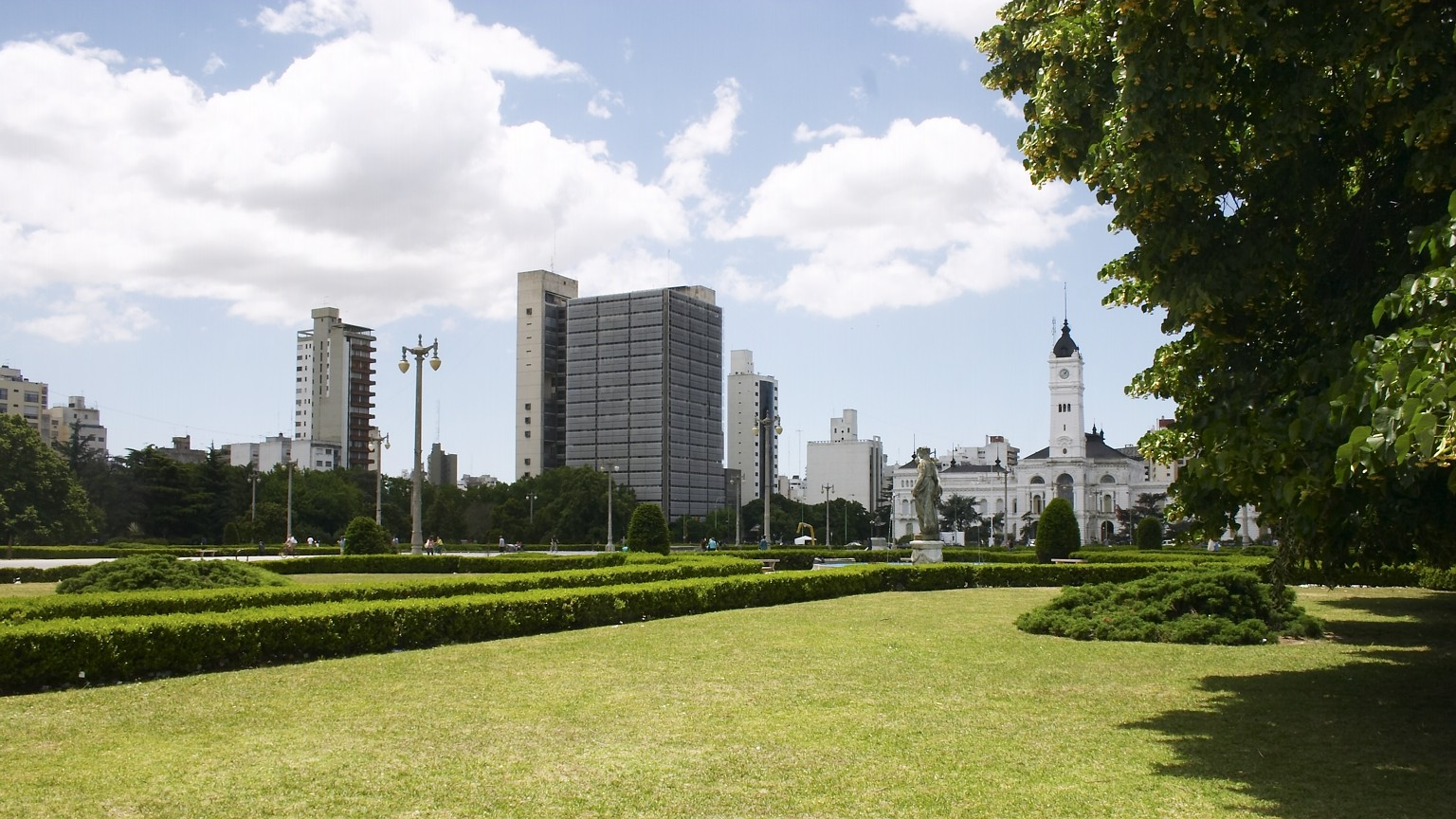
Downtown La Plata

City	Population (2010 Census)
Mar del Plata	593,337
Bahía Blanca	291,327
Merlo (Note: The number provided by INDEC includes the combined population of the cities of Merlo and Parque San Martín. The population of each one of that cities is unknown.)	268,961
Quilmes	262,379
Gregorio de Laferrere	248,362
José C. Paz	247,217
Banfield (Note: The number provided by INDEC seems to include the combined population of the cities of Banfield and Ingeniero Budge, and perhaps some other locality in the Lomas de Zamora Partido (most notably San José) that does not appear differentiated in the census. The population of each one of that cities is unknown.)	246,467
González Catán	238,067
Lanús	215,956
La Plata	193,144

== Tourism ==
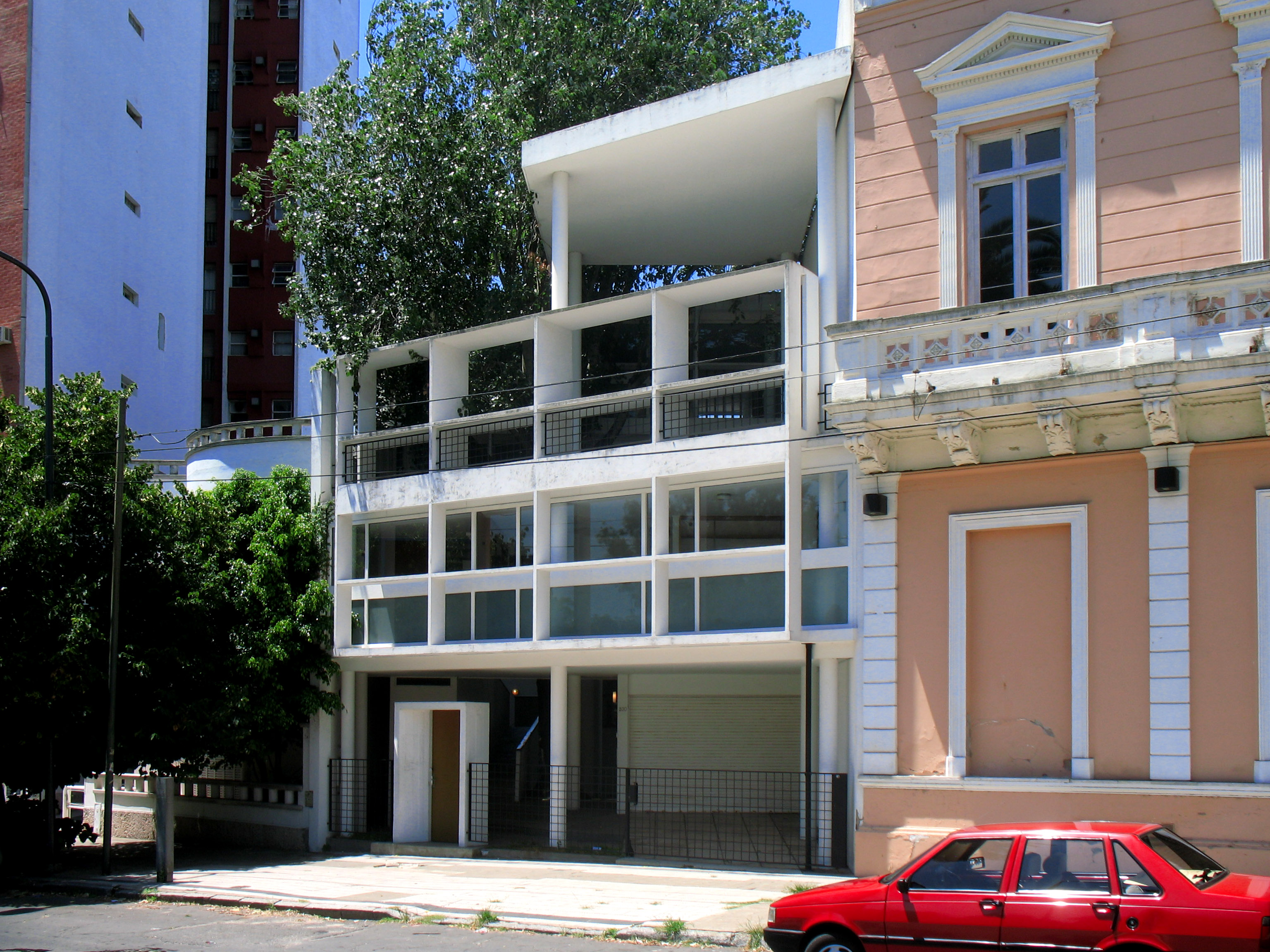
Curutchet House, World Heritage Site in La Plata

Tourists, mainly from Buenos Aires, visit the so-called Atlantic Coast (Costa Atlántica) corridor of extensive beaches. There are many cities and towns along the coastline, which starts some 250 kilometres (160 mi) from Buenos Aires after the Samborombón Bay. Among them, the biggest and most important is Mar del Plata, followed by the La Costa Partido, Pinamar, Villa Gesell, Miramar, and Necochea. The most important summer-related event, the National Sea Festival, is held annually in the city of Mar del Plata. The city's Central Casino and Grand Provincial Hotel are among the nation's largest.

Other destinations include the Ventana Sierras, Tandil, Tigre, the Paraná Delta, Isla Martín García, Olavarria, the Chascomús and Gómez lagoons, Campos del Tuyú National Park, and La Plata.

Agritourism in estancias (plantations) has become increasingly popular for foreigners visiting the province in recent years. The province's wine district, centered on Médanos, has also become prominent for visitors touring the Argentina Wine Route.

== Sports ==
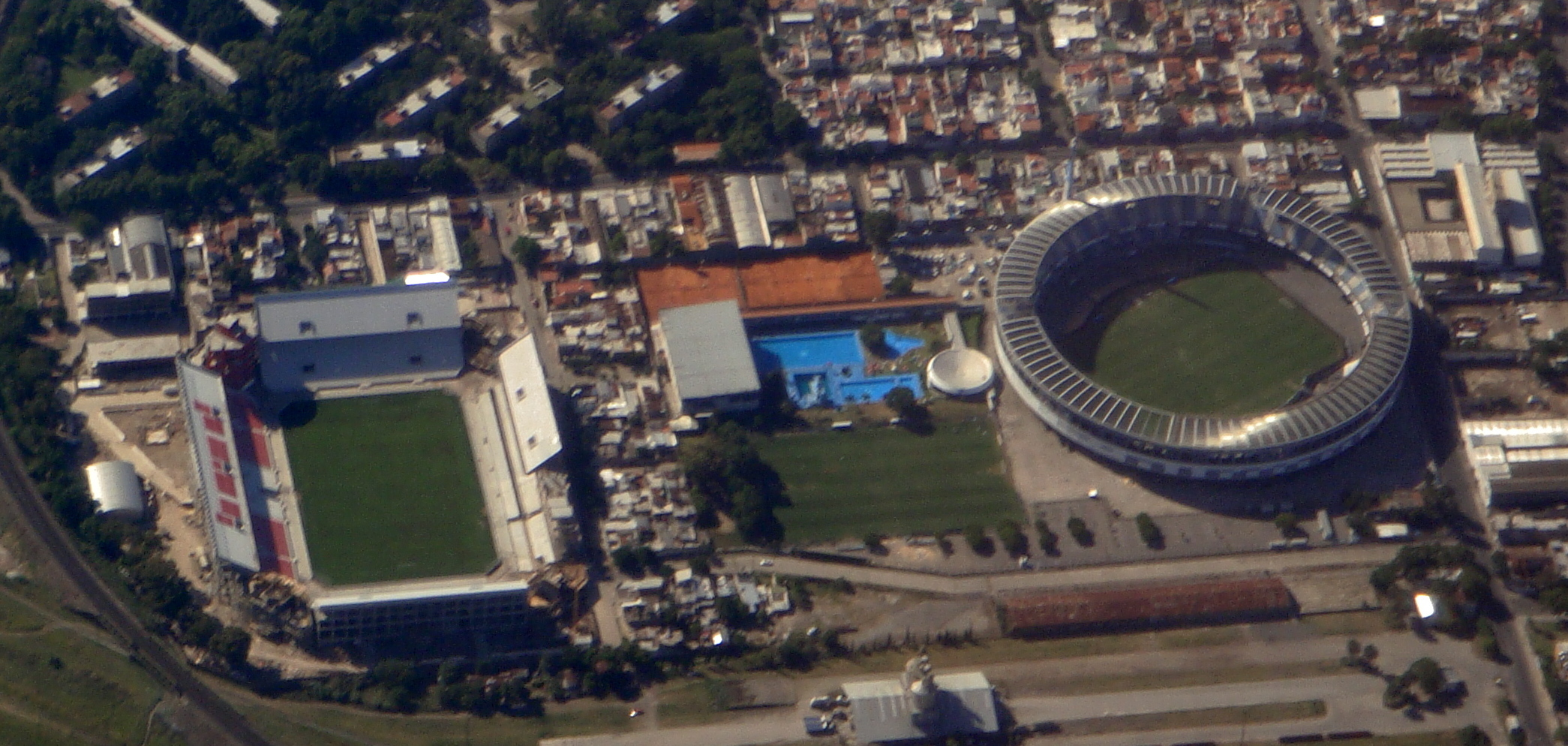
Libertadores de América and Presidente Perón stadiums in Avellaneda.

In Buenos Aires Province, as throughout Argentina, football is the predominant sport. The province has numerous professional football teams, with most of them concentrated in the Greater Buenos Aires area. Rivals Club Atlético Independiente and Racing Club de Avellaneda are the most successful, famous and followed beyond the province borders. Other notable teams in Greater Buenos Aires include Arsenal, Quilmes, Banfield, Lanús, Los Andes, Chacarita Juniors, Tigre and Defensa y Justicia. In the capital of the province, Estudiantes and Gimnasia y Esgrima stand out.

Other clubs in the rest of the province include Olimpo and Villa Mitre (Bahía Blanca), Huracán de Tres Arroyos (Tres Arroyos), Aldosivi and Alvarado (Mar del Plata), Sarmiento (Junín), Douglas Haig (Pergamino), Agropecuario (Carlos Casares), Santamarina (Tandil), Racing de Olavarría (Olavarría), Flandria, Club Luján and Villa Dálmine (Campana).

The city of Mar del Plata hosted six matches of the 1978 FIFA World Cup and the 1995 Pan American Games, and annually holds the National Evita Games and the final stage of the Bonaerense Games, the last being the most important provincial sports event for young, the elderly and people with disabilities.

The province is represented in the Argentine Rugby Union (UAR) by four unions: the Rugby Union of Buenos Aires (URBA), includes teams of the Autonomous City of Buenos Aires (CABA), the Rugby Union of Mar del Plata, the Western Rugby Union of the Province of Buenos Aires (UROBA) and the Southern Rugby Union. Some of the most prominent clubs are CASI and SIC of San Isidro.

Among others, some of the most important basketball teams in the province are: Peñarol de Mar del Plata, Quilmes de Mar del Plata, Bahía Basket, Estudiantes de Bahía Blanca, Olimpo de Bahía Blanca, Argentino de Junín, Club Ciclista Juninense, and Estudiantes de Olavarría, Gimnasia y Esgrima de La Plata, Club Atlético Platense and Lanús.

There are numerous racetracks, including La Plata, Nueve de Julio, Olavarría, Mar de Ajó, Junín, Balcarce, San Nicolás de los Arroyos and Bahía Blanca. The San Isidro Racecourse was inaugurated in 1935 and hosts the Carlos Pellegrini Grand Prix. The Hipodromo de La Plata is the third largest in Argentina.

== Economy ==
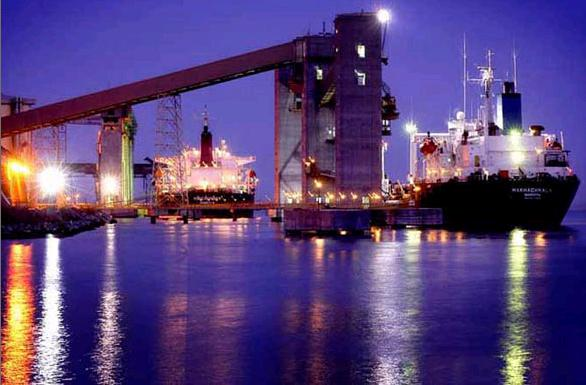
Port of Bahía Blanca

The province's economy has long been the largest in Argentina, estimated in 2014 to have been US$407.6 billion (more than a third of the national total, which was around US$680.8 billion in 2016 according to Argentina's economical growing. It has a per capita income of $24,780 (around $27,300 in 2016). The province is the nation's chief exporter, generating nearly $107 billion in exports in 2016 (37% of the nation's total).

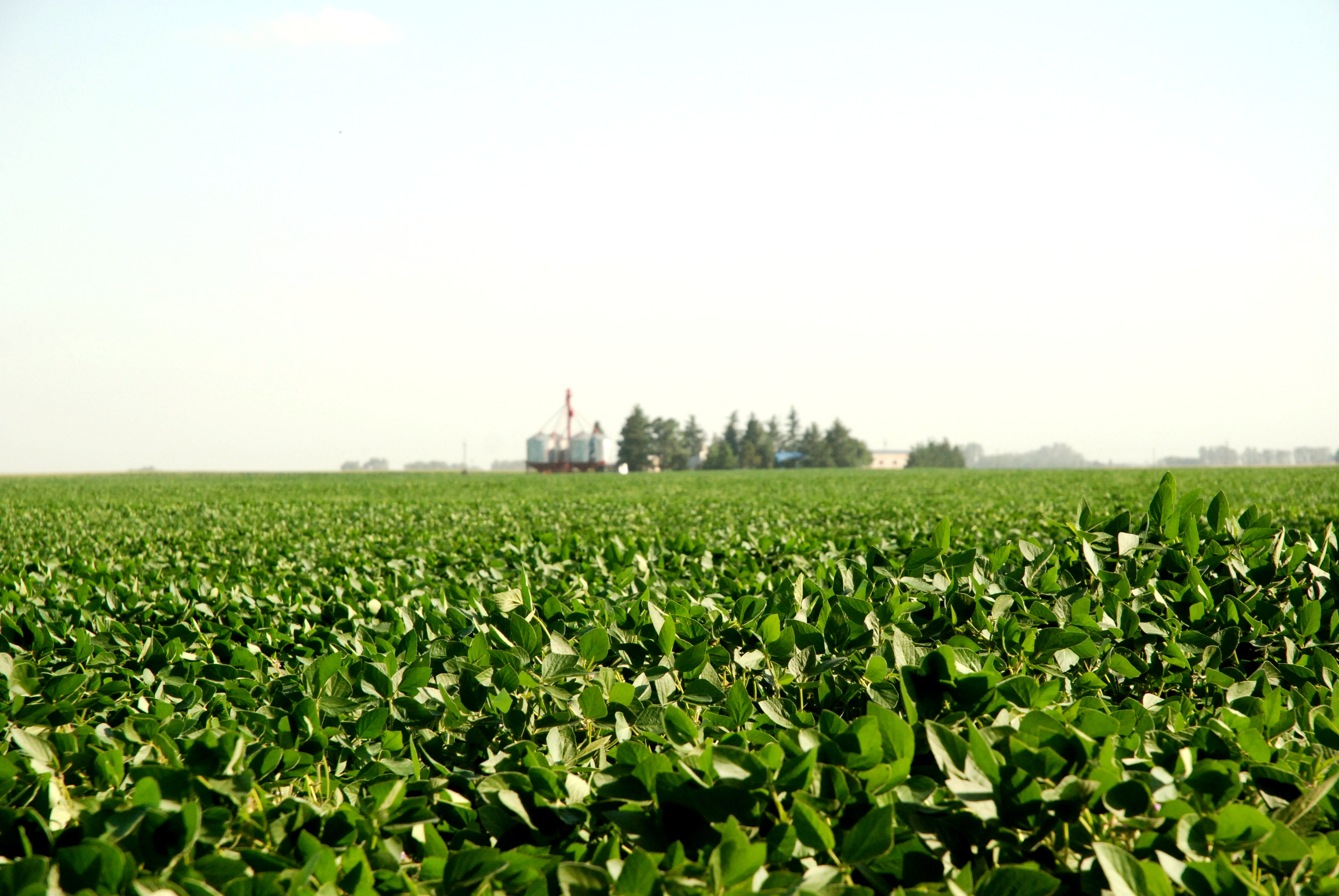
Soybean fields near Junín

Agriculture in the province is renowned around the world for its productivity. The province is Argentina's chief agricultural producer, and accounted for at least $8 billion in export earnings in 2014. This sector adds about 5% to the province's highly diversified economy, however. The province's ranching sector is diversified, and though cattle historically provided the main animal husbandry activity, Buenos Aires is also the top producer of sheep, pork, and chicken meat of the country. Equally important is the dairy industry. Crop harvests are the most diverse in the nation and have grown to record levels in recent decades. The most important crops include soybean, maize, wheat, sunflower and other oilseeds, like flax. More recently, premium wines have been produced in the Buenos Aires wine region in the south of the province.

Manufacturing accounts for a fourth of the province's output and is about 40% of the entire nation's. The industry of the province is diverse: chemical, pharmaceutical, metallurgic, motor vehicles, machinery, textiles and the food industry are the most notable. Excluding processed agricultural items, the province was responsible for over US$70 billion of industrial exports in 2016 and accounted for a third of all Argentine exports.

The province's services sector is well-diversified and differs little from national trends. The largest local bank is the public Bank of the Province of Buenos Aires. The institution, the second largest in Argentina, holds nearly a tenth of the nation's bank deposits.

=== Transport ===
==== Airports ====
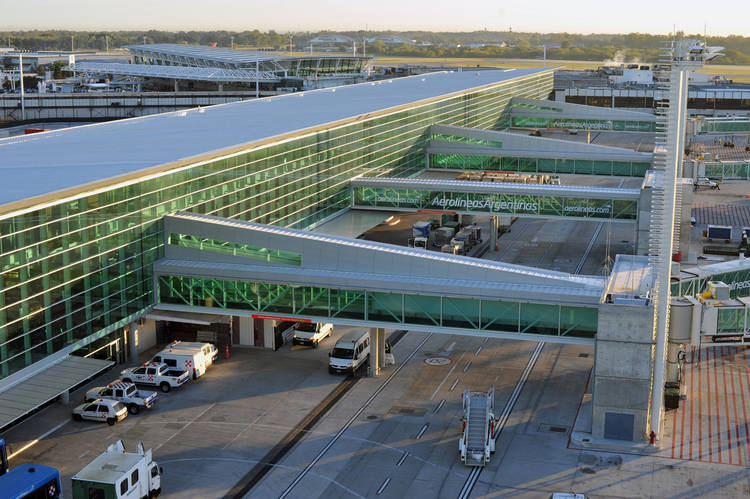
Ministro Pistarini International Airport

Name	City	OACI	IATA	FAA
Ministro Pistarini	Ezeiza	SAEZ	EZE	EZE
San Fernando	San Fernando	SADF	FDO	FDO
Astor Piazzolla	Mar del Plata	SAZM	MDQ	MDP
Comandante Espora	Bahía Blanca	SAZB	BHI	EPO
Edgardo Hugo Yelpo	Necochea	SAZO	NEC	NEC
Junín	Junín	SAAJ	JNI	NIN
La Plata	La Plata	SADL	LPG	PTA
Olavarría	Olavarría	SAZF	OVR	OLA
Santa Teresita	Santa Teresita	SAZL	SST	SST
Tandil	Tandil	SAZT	TDL	DIL
Villa Gesell	Villa Gesell	SAZV	VLG	GES

==== Ports ====
Name	City	Location
Puerto Ingeniero White	Bahía Blanca	Mar Argentino
Puerto Galván	Bahía Blanca	Mar Argentino
Puerto Rosales	Punta Alta	Mar Argentino
Puerto de San Nicolás de los Arroyos	San Nicolás	Río Paraná
Puerto de Campana	Campana	Río Paraná
Puerto de La Plata	Ensenada	Río de la Plata
Puerto de Mar del Plata	Mar del Plata	Mar Argentino
Puerto de Quequén	Necochea	Mar Argentino

==== Railways ====
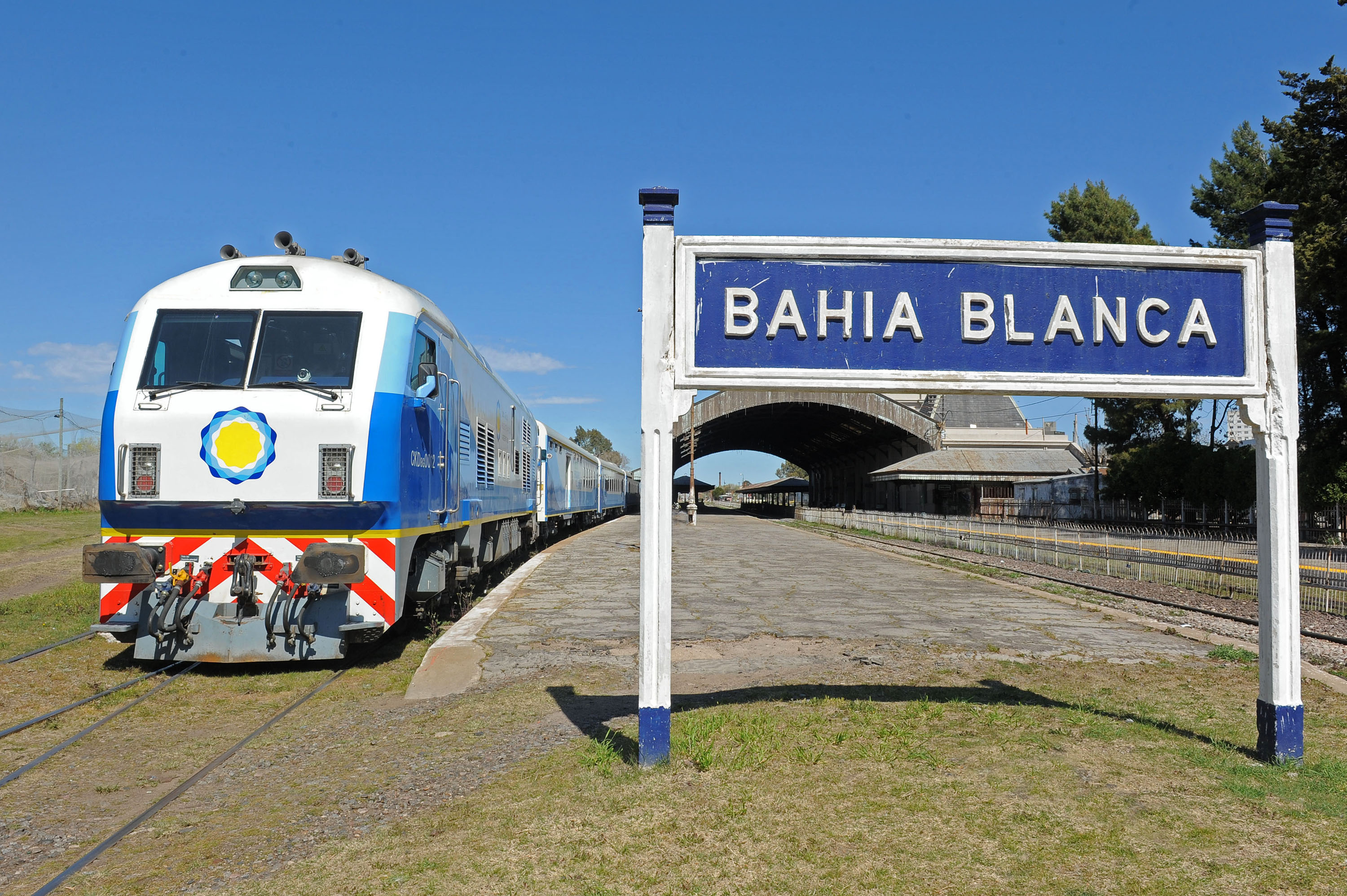
CNR CKD8 locomotive at Bahía Blanca Sud railway station

Railway	City	Station
General San Martín	Buenos Aires	Retiro San Martín
General San Martín	Chacabuco	Chacabuco
General San Martín	Junín	Junín
Domingo Faustino Sarmiento	Buenos Aires	Once
Domingo Faustino Sarmiento	Luján	Luján
Domingo Faustino Sarmiento	Mercedes	Mercedes
Domingo Faustino Sarmiento	Chivilcoy	Chivilcoy Sud
General Roca	Buenos Aires	Constitución
General Roca	San Miguel del Monte	Monte
General Roca	Las Flores	Las Flores
General Roca	Olavarría	Olavarría
General Roca	Azul	Azul
General Roca	Pigüé	Pigüé
General Roca	Bahía Blanca	Bahía Blanca Sud
General Roca	Mar del Plata	Mar del Plata

== See also ==
- Buenos Aires Provincial Police
