= Sierra de la Ventana (mountains) =

Mountain range in Argentina

Ventana system
- Sistema de Ventania
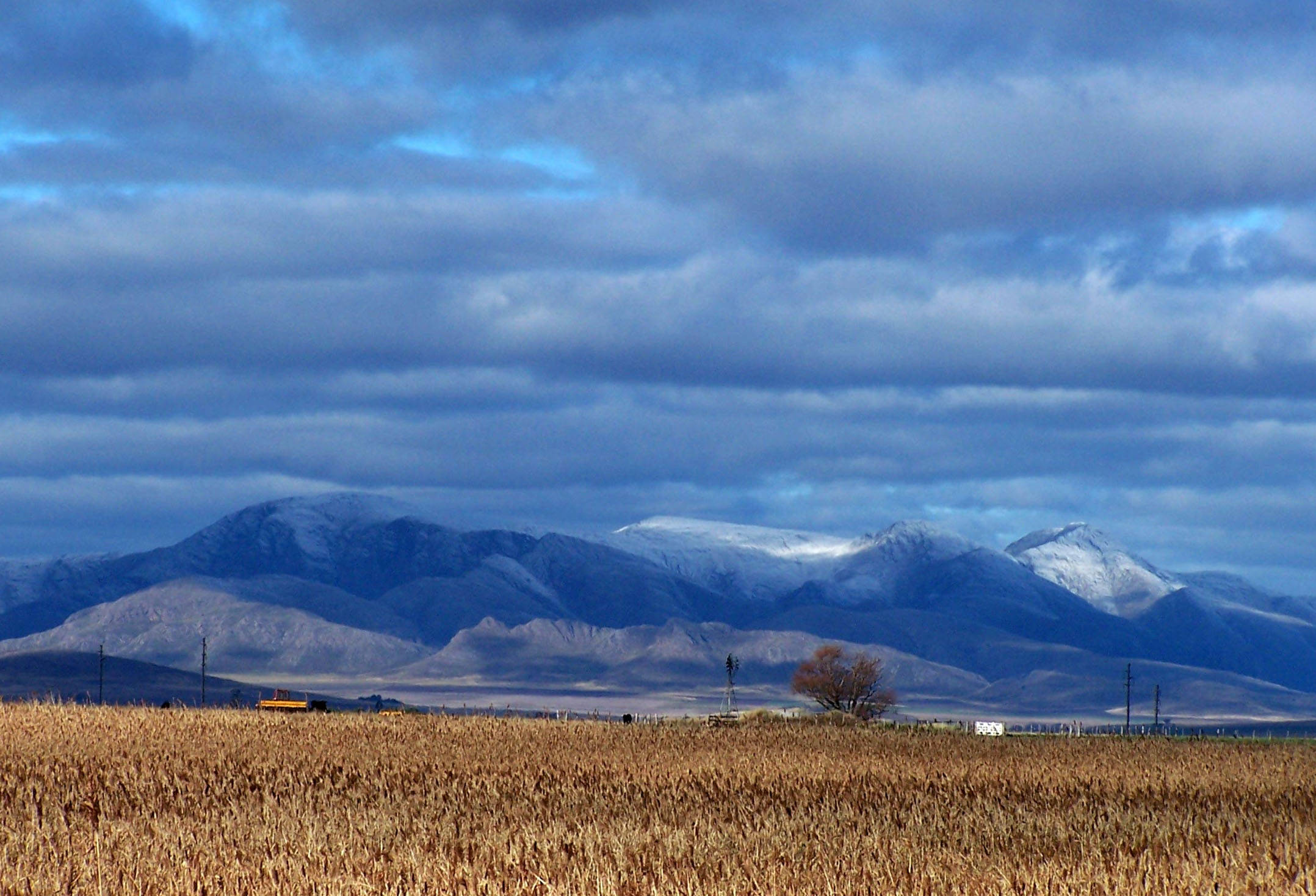

Highest point
- Peak: Cerro Tres Picos, near Tornquist
- Elevation: 1,239 m (4,065 ft)
- Coordinates: 38°9′20″S 61°57′0″W

Dimensions
- Length: 195 km (121 mi) NW to SE

Naming
- Native name: Sistema de las Sierras de Ventania (Spanish)

Geography
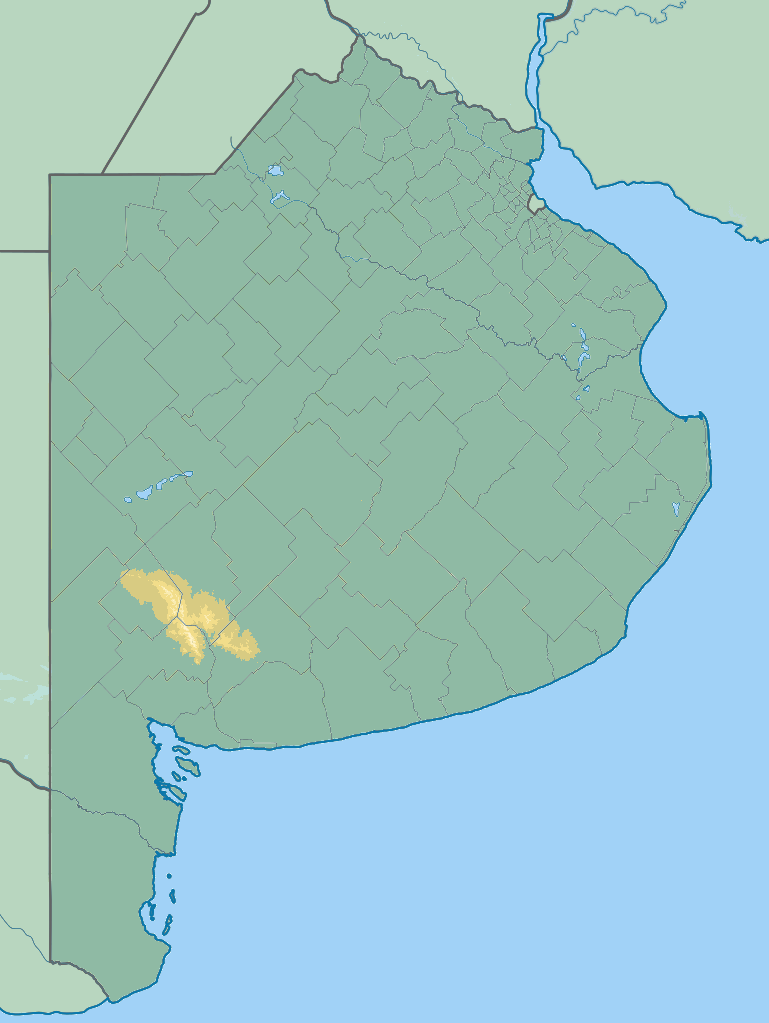
- Country: Argentina
- Province: Buenos Aires Province
- Settlements: Pigüé, Puan and Tornquist

The Sierra de la Ventana (also Sierras de Ventania) is a mountain range in Buenos Aires Province, and one of only two located within the Pampas ecosystem alongside the Tandilia mountain range.

== Overview ==
Bounded approximately by the Laguna del Monte, Guaminí at its northwestern end and the Atlantic Ocean to its southwest, the Sierra de la Ventana lies on a precambrian base formed around 2.2 billion years ago, and is interspersed with granite, granodiorite, and amphibole deposits.

Characterized by its escarpments, this orography prevented the deposit of significant amounts of loess, and made the area the least propitious for agriculture within the Pampas; sunflower fields are common along the foot of the range. Its soils feature an A-AC-C horizonation, not unlike those found along the Appalachian range. Its climate is somewhat colder and drier than that prevailing in the surrounding Humid Pampas, though the range receives more rainfall than the Semi-arid Pampas located to the west. Sizable extensions of lacebark pines grow along the range, possibly introduced from Asia.

Peppered by caves and grottoes, the range is relatively modest in height and extension, and exceeds 1000 m (3280 ft) at only six points. These peaks are:

- Cura Malal Chico (1000 m)
- Cura Malal Grande (1037 m)
- Napostá Grande (1108 m)
- La Ventana (1184 m)
- Destierro Primero (1172 m)
- Tres Picos (1239 m)

British naturalist Charles Darwin described his ascent of the Sierra de la Ventana range in the sixth chapter of his work The Voyage of the Beagle. The region's breezes and mild climate made it a tourist attraction beginning in the early part of the 20th century, and its principal early promoter was Ernesto Tornquist, a prominent rancher, banker and developer. The extension of the Buenos Aires Great Southern Railway past the area led to the construction of the Club Hotel de la Ventana, a luxury casino and hotel, and the outpost of Villa Ventana, a resort community developed by the Sociedad de Compañías de Tierras y Hoteles de Sierra de la Ventana. The hotel closed after President Hipólito Yrigoyen's 1918 edict banning gambling, and development of the area's tourism resources remained below their potential in subsequent decades.

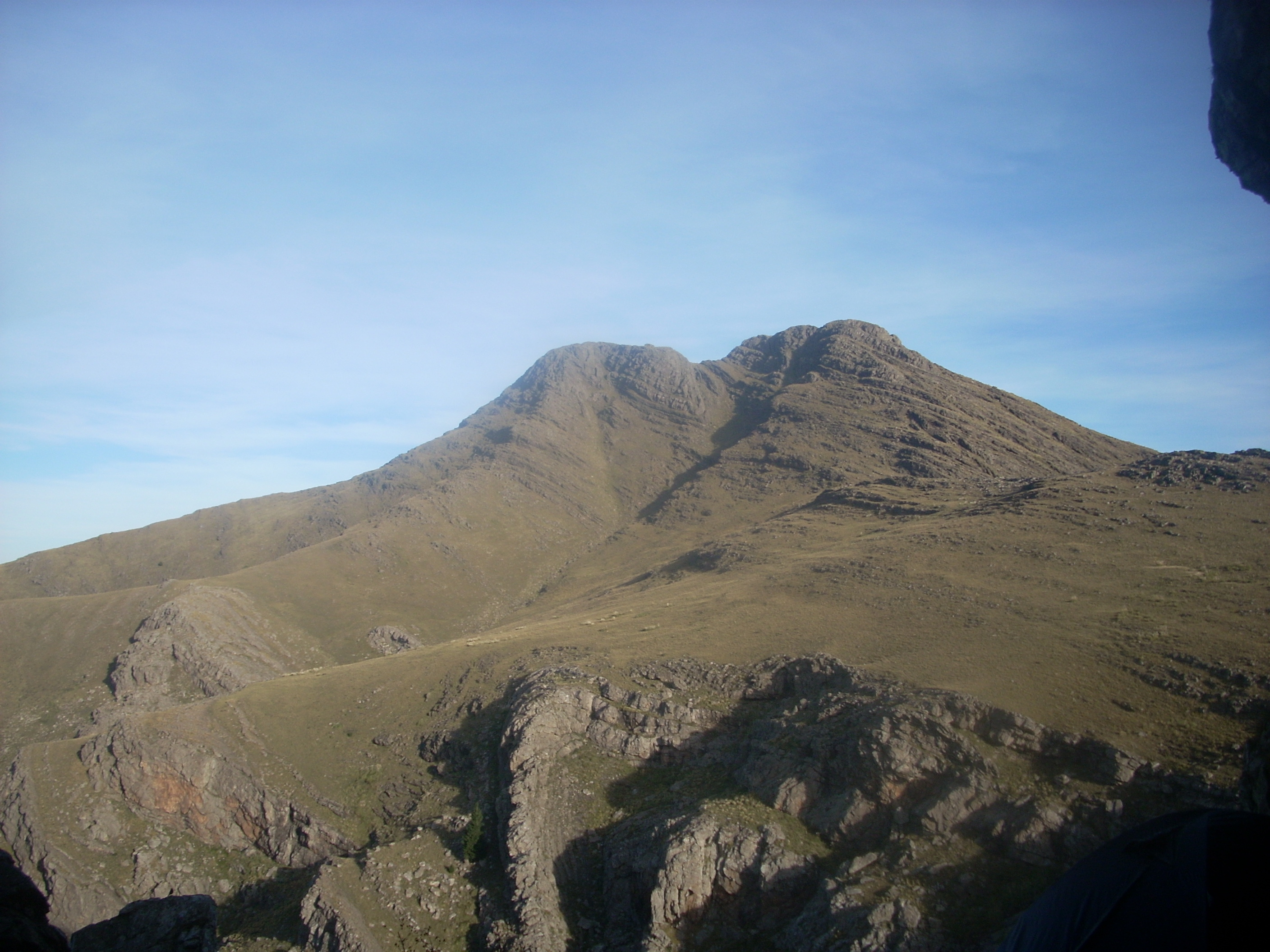
Aerial view of Cerro Tres Picos.

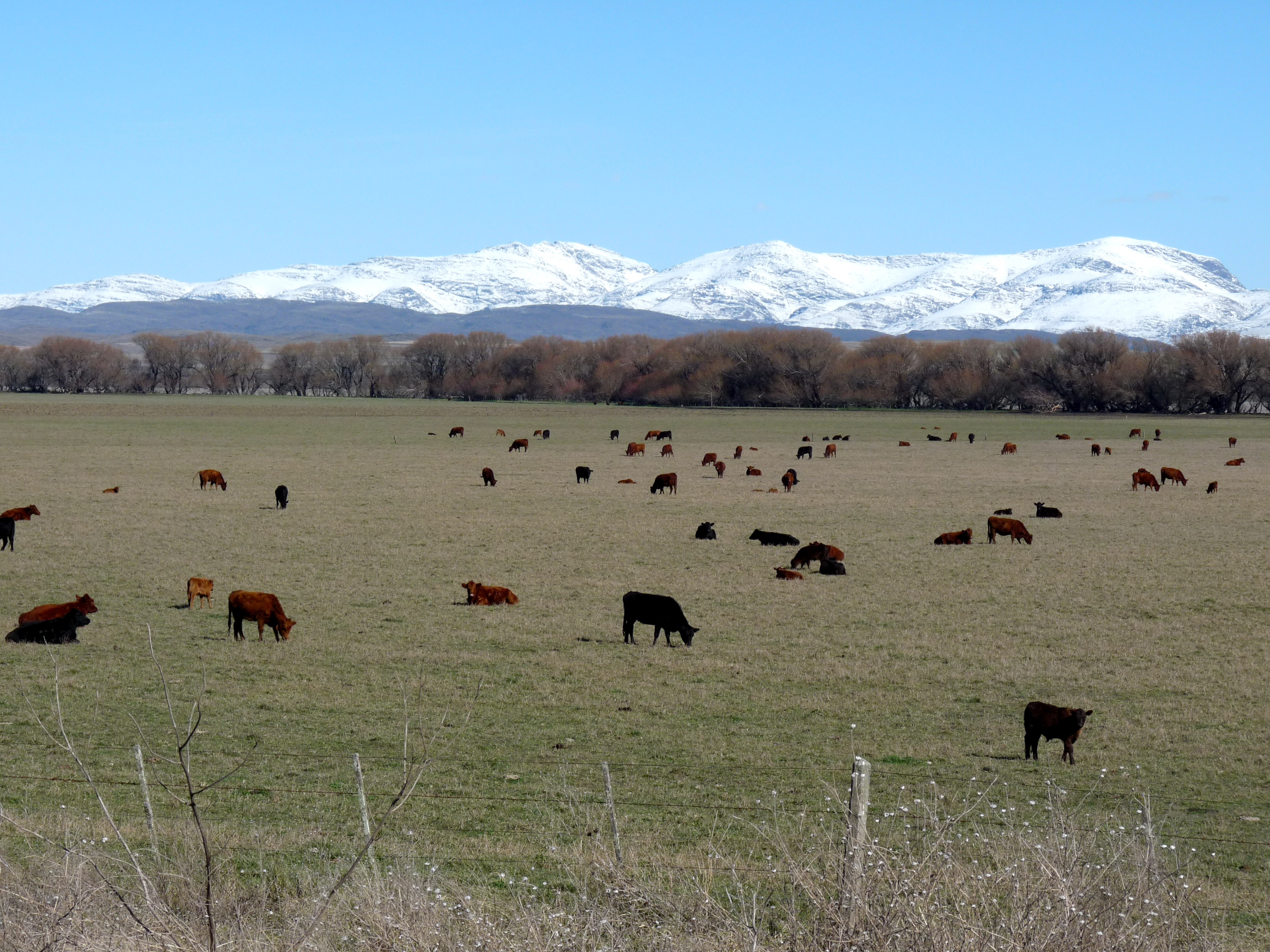
Surroundings of Coronel Suárez.

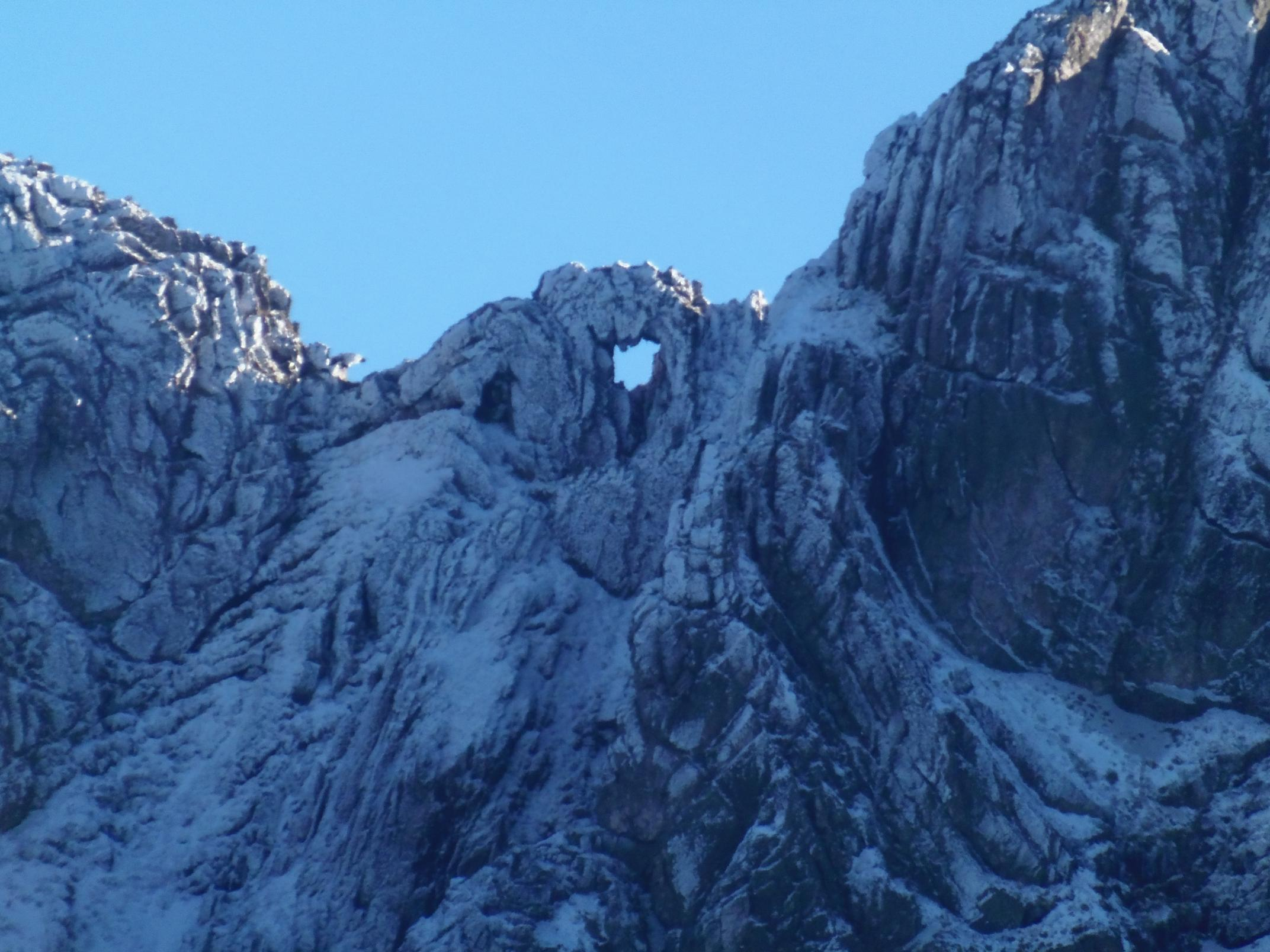
"La Ventana" (The Window) landmark.

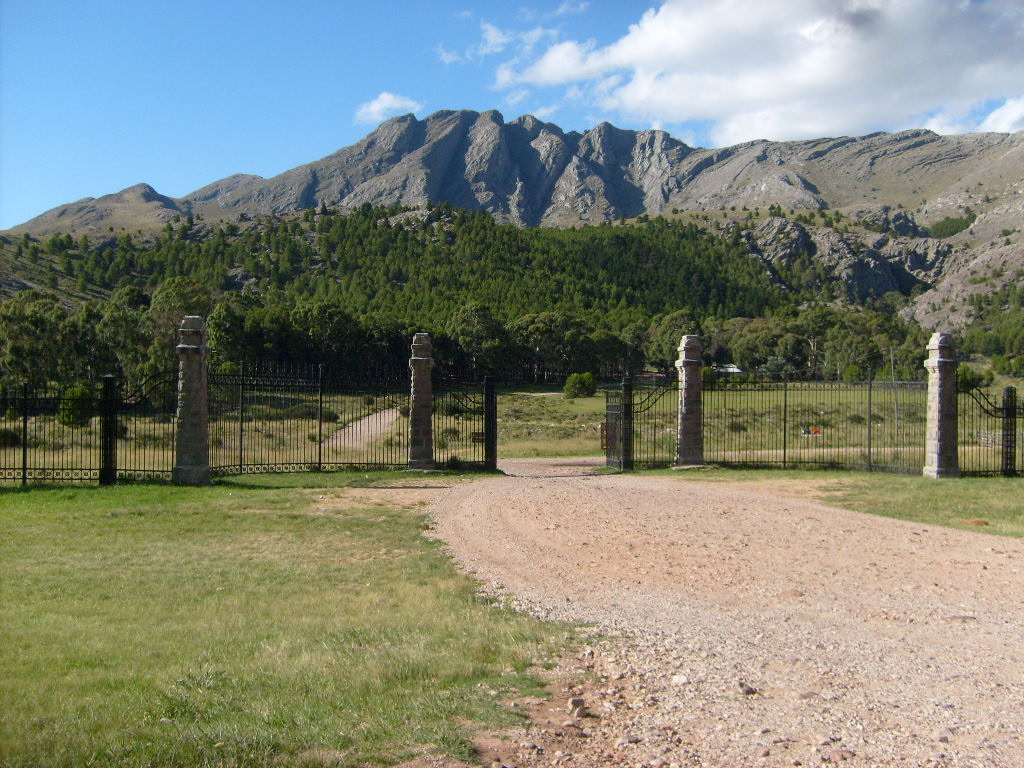
Ernesto Tornquist Provincial Park
