= Ernesto Tornquist Provincial Park =

Provincial park in Buenos Aires province, Argentina

- Parque Provincial Ernesto Tornquist
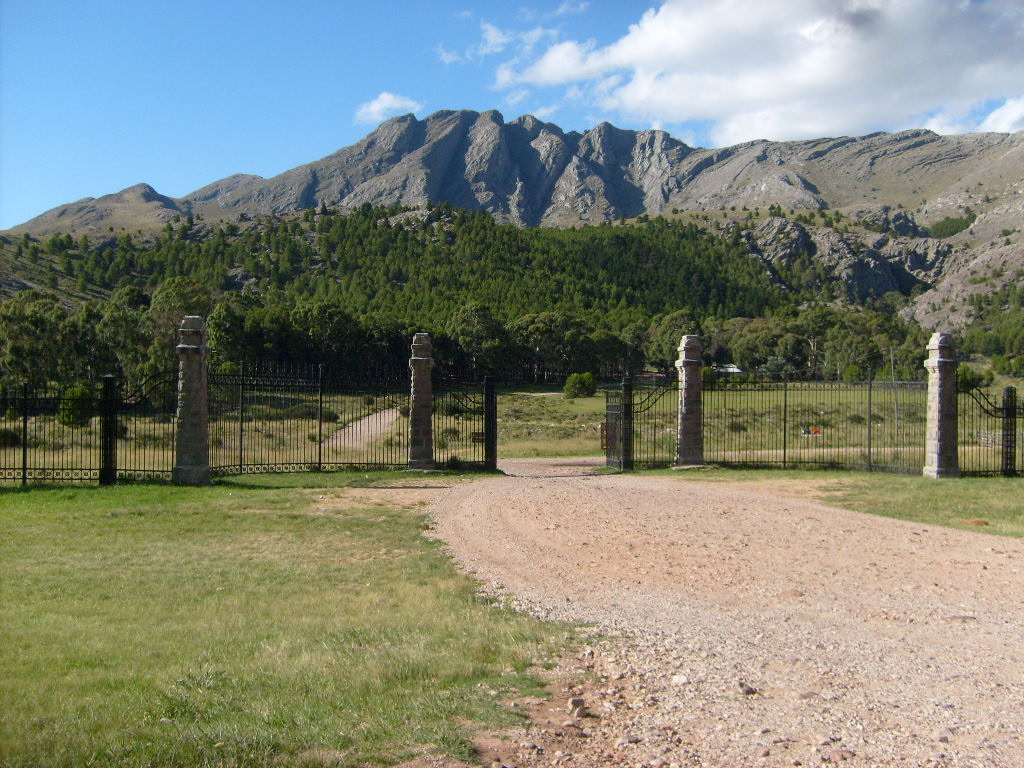
- Cerro Ventana entrance

- Location within Argentina
- Location: Buenos Aires Province, Argentina
- Nearest city: Sierra de La Ventana
- Coordinates: 38°03′S 62°02′W
- Area: 6,718 ha (67.18 km^{2}; 25.94 sq mi)
- Established: April 23, 1958
- Website: Parque Provincial Ernesto Tornquist

Ernesto Tornquist Provincial Park (Spanish: Parque Provincial Ernesto Tornquist) is a provincial protected area in the south of Buenos Aires Province, mid-eastern Argentina. Established on 23 April 1958, it covers a small area of the Ventania System.
