= Cerro Tres Picos =

Mountain in Argentina

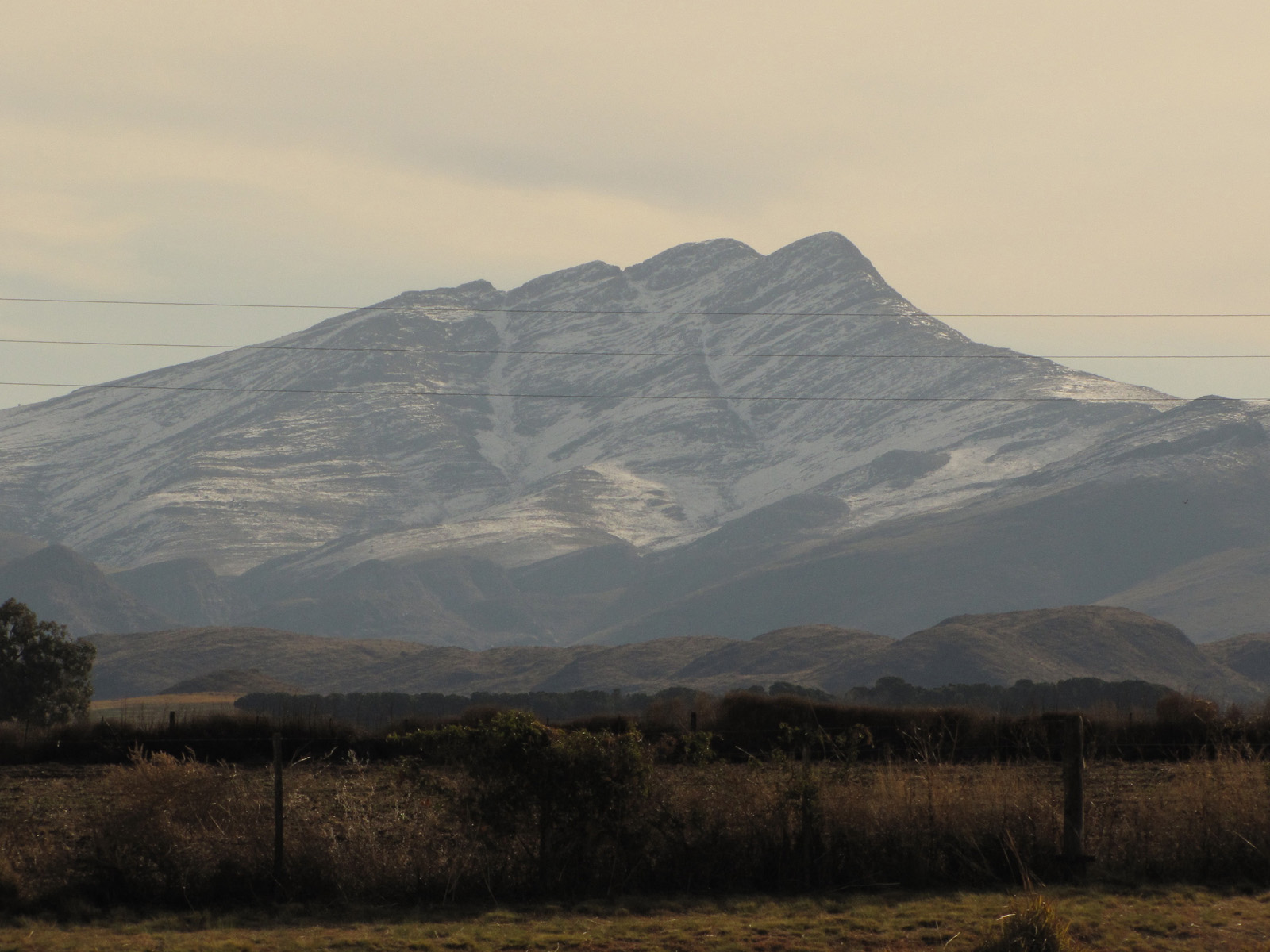
- View of Cerro Tres Picos from Saldungaray.

Highest point
- Elevation: 1,239 m (4,065 ft)
- Prominence: 1,076 m (3,530 ft)
- Isolation: 637.54 km (396.15 mi)
- Listing: Ribu
- Coordinates: 38°9′29″S 61°57′6″W

Naming
- English translation: Three Peaks Hill
- Language of name: Spanish

Geography
- Location within Argentina
- Location: Argentina
- Parent range: Sierra de la Ventana

Cerro Tres Picos is the highest point of the Sierra de la Ventana mountain range in the province of Buenos Aires, Argentina. As such, it is also the highest point in Buenos Aires province, as well as in the pampas region.

== Geography ==
=== Location ===
The mountain is 650 km southwest of the city of Buenos Aires; the closest settlement is Villa Ventana in the Tornquist Partido.

It is located on private property owned by the Fundación Funke (Funke Foundation), a charitable organization that maintains the land donated by German immigrant Rodolfo Funke after his death in 1938.

=== Climate ===
The mountain has a dry climate. Summers are warm, with temperatures above 30 °C during the day. Winters have an average high of 8 °C and are somewhat rainier, with nights frequently below freezing. Snowfalls can occur sometimes.

Climate data for Cerro Tres Picos (1,239 metres - modelled data)
Month	Jan	Feb	Mar	Apr	May	Jun	Jul	Aug	Sep	Oct	Nov	Dec	Year
Mean daily maximum °C (°F)	25 (77)	23 (73)	20 (68)	15 (59)	10 (50)	8 (46)	7 (45)	9 (48)	11 (52)	15 (59)	19 (66)	23 (73)	15 (60)
Mean daily minimum °C (°F)	9 (48)	8 (46)	7 (45)	3 (37)	0 (32)	−2 (28)	−3 (27)	−2 (28)	−1 (30)	2 (36)	4 (39)	7 (45)	3 (37)
Average precipitation mm (inches)	60 (2.4)	63 (2.5)	65 (2.6)	44 (1.7)	32 (1.3)	18 (0.7)	27 (1.1)	32 (1.3)	45 (1.8)	68 (2.7)	68 (2.7)	60 (2.4)	582 (23.2)
Source: MeteoBlue
