= Semi-arid Pampas =

Grassland ecoregion in south central Argentina

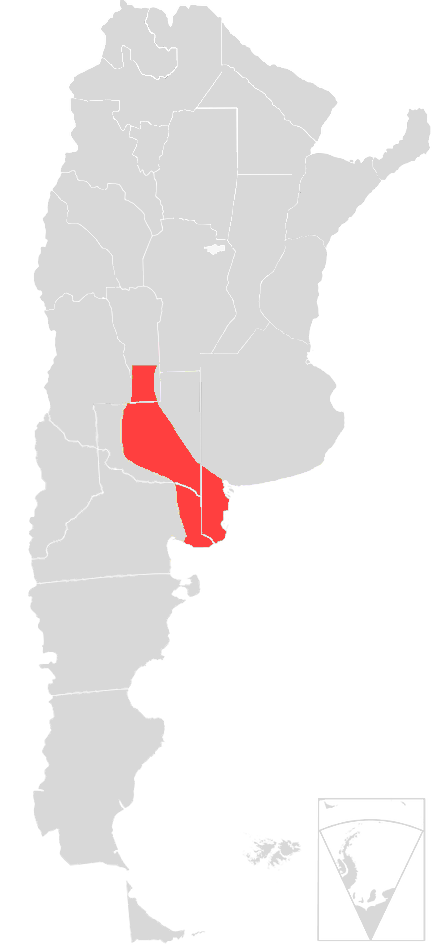
Map of the Arid Pampas in red, Argentina in gray

The Semi-arid Pampas, also known as the Dry Pampas, is a temperate grassland ecoregion of south central Argentina.

== Setting ==
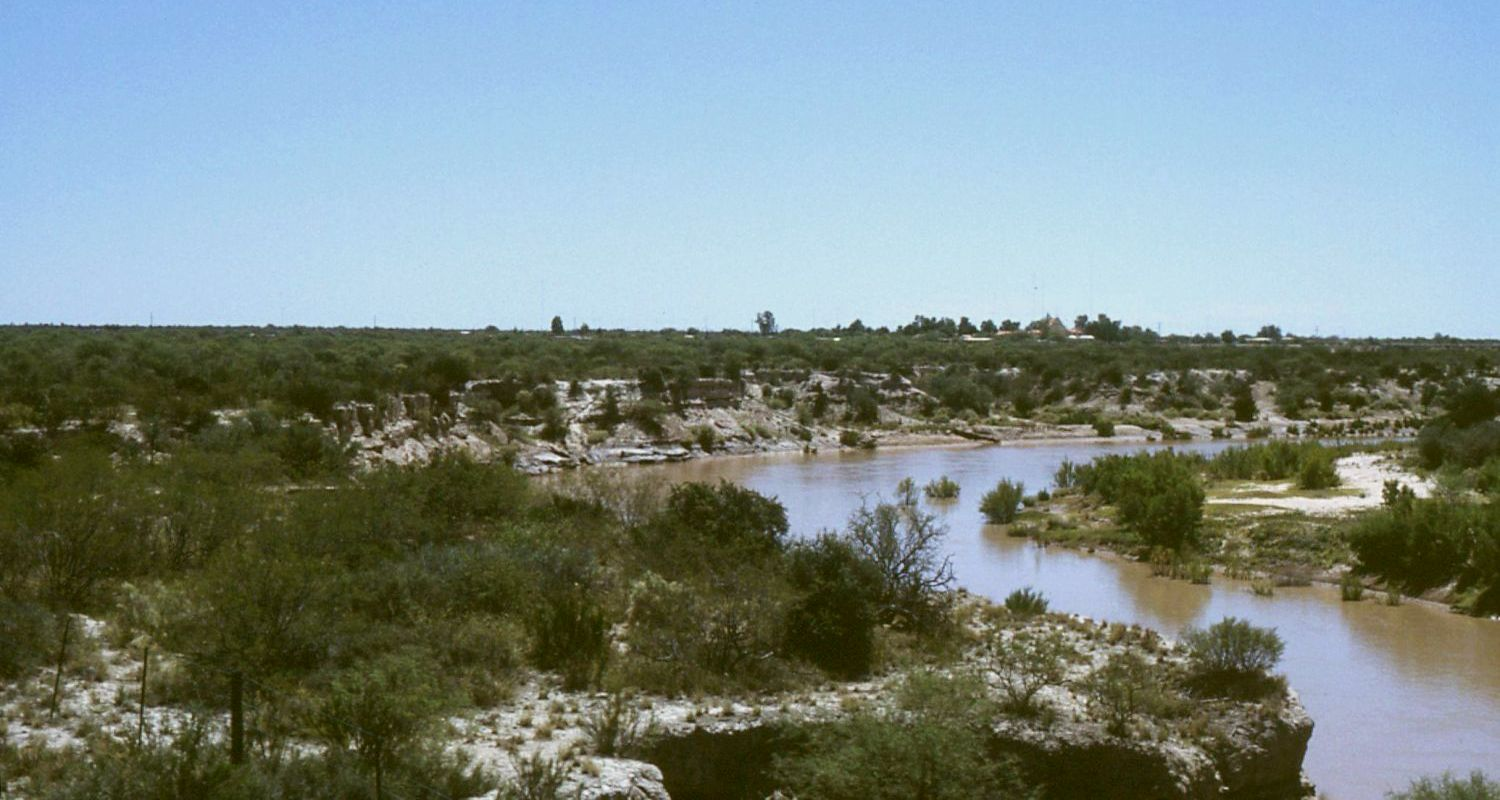
View of the Desaguadero River along the caldén-speckled espinál between Mendoza and San Luis provinces.

The Semi-arid Pampas cover an area of 327,000 square kilometers (126,000 sq mi), including western Buenos Aires Province, southern Cordoba and San Luis Provinces and most of La Pampa Province. The area is, in all, home to no more than a million people, who generally enjoy some of the nation's lowest poverty rates.

The Humid Pampas grassland lies to the east, while the drier Argentine Espinál (thorny) grassland lies to the west. The soil tends to be sandier in this region than to the east, though both regions are characterized by their mostly minimal incline and frequent finger lakes. Generally more similar than not, these two biomes are mostly distinguished by their contrasting rainfall quantities, soil quality and land use; this section of the pampas typically sees about a third less rainfall (700 mm, 27 in) than the humid pampas.

== Flora ==
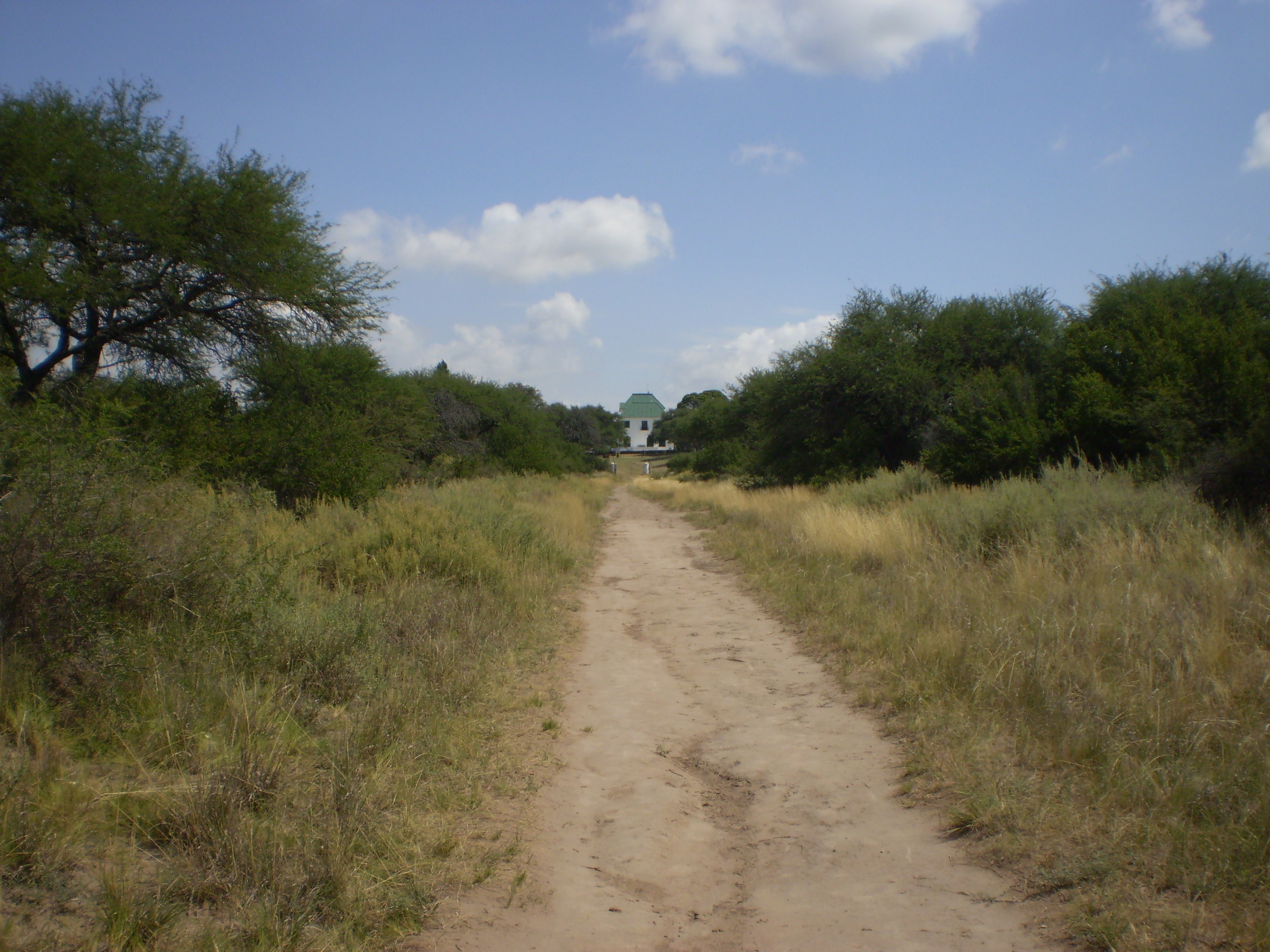
Path in La Pampa Province, lined with caldén.

Not unlike the more humid pampas to the east, this area is characterized by its extensive grasslands. This groundcover, however, tends to be closer to long-grass varieties found in the world's steppes. Its landscape punctuated by relatively few trees (mostly imported ombúes, alders and Italian cypresses planted to provide wind breaks or landscaping), the region is home to intermittent shrublands, therein particularly carquejilla and caldén (prized for their medicinal qualities), as well as the shady algarrobo, common to much of Argentina.

== Fauna ==
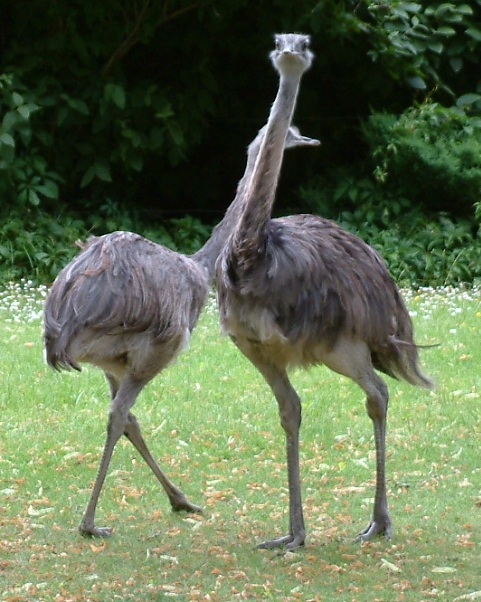
Darwin's rheas, known locally as the ñandú.

In part owing to its sparse landscape and unreliable rains, the area's fauna rather resembles much of neighboring Patagonia's. Perhaps the most common natural inhabitant to the region is the ñandú, or, Darwin's rhea. Nearly ubiquitous to the region in the early 19th century, vast herds were often observed at the time and, indeed, they and their eggs had for centuries provided the Puelches and the area's other indigenous peoples with much of their protein needs. Targeted during successive genocidal campaigns between 1830 and 1880, however, these inhabitants lost most ñandús to massacres by Argentine armies, who believed that in so doing, the indigenous tribes could be starved into surrender.

Nearing extinction by the 1920s, the ñandú herds have recovered substantially and have since then, like the likewise then-nearly extinct pampas deer, been protected by law. Other common fowl include gray hawks, partridges, martins, coots and storks.

The region is also home to pumas, pampas foxes, cavias, maras and other drought-resistant mammals, as well as some also common to North America, like skunks and opossums.

== Human use ==
The arrival of British-financed railways to the region in the 1880s brought with it the area's first significant presence of white settlers, some of whom had served in the regiments involved in the Conquest of the Desert and were granted vast tracts of land. Much of the area was subsequently fenced into cattle and sheep ranches, which dominate the region's land use to the present day; area ranchers raise approximately four million cattle (a tenth of Argentina's total production). Since the 1940s, advances in agriculture and crop breeding have allowed for intensive wheat, sunflower, oats and alfalfa cultivation, as well.

== Conservation and threats ==
Though many of the hydroelectric projects put into place since then have encouraged the development of a scattering of prosperous urban areas like Santa Rosa, La Pampa, some have had unintended consequences to the area's ecological balance. Dams along the Atuel River, for instance, are often allowed to release the rainy season's excess water with little regard to the area around rural Algarrobo del Aguila, La Pampa, causing avoidable inconvenience and disruption of nearby wetlands.

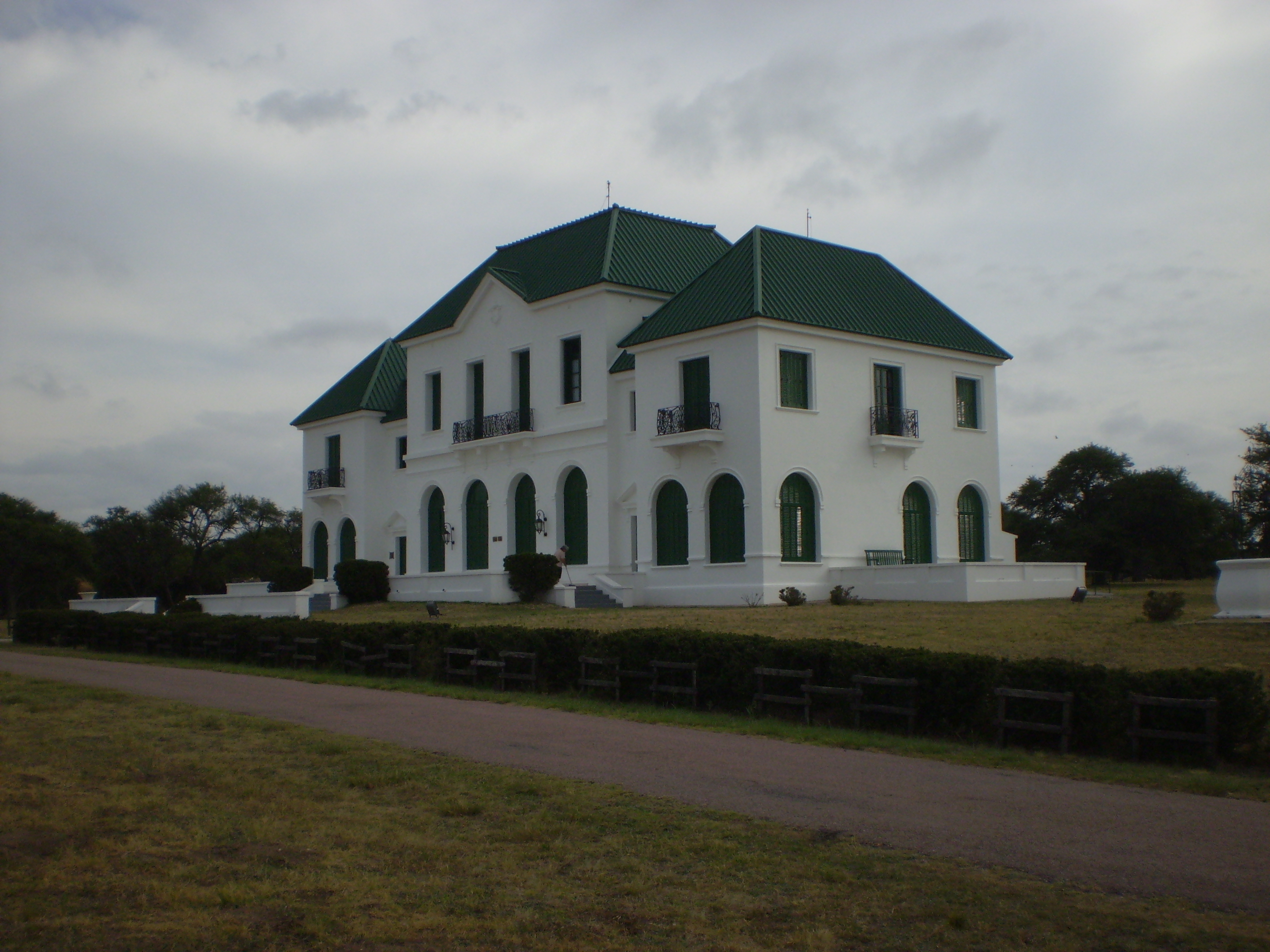
The former Roca-Luro Estate, now part of Parque Luro Natural Preserve, La Pampa Province.

Until recently, the region was the only one in Argentina lacking a national park or natural preserve. In 1971, descendants of La Pampa Province landowners Arminda Roca and Pedro Luro deeded 7,600 hectares (29 mi^{2}) to the provincial government, which opened the park to the public five years later. Though the area would not be designated as fully protected until 1996, this was the first significant move to protect the biome. Today the Luro Park Natural Preserve is the most visited such area in the dry pampas region. In 1977, a 9,900 hectare (38 mi^{2}) parcel in La Pampa Province's southern dry grasslands were set aside as Lihué Calel National Park.

These accomplishments notwithstanding, the area's ecosystem has been under increasing pressure by grazing and irrigation activities, apart from population and economic growth themselves.

== See also ==
- Arid Forest Research Institute
