= List of botanical gardens in Argentina =

Botanical gardens in Argentina have collections consisting entirely of Argentina native and endemic species; most have a collection that include plants from around the world. There are botanical gardens and arboreta in all states and territories of Argentina, most are administered by local governments, some are privately owned.

This list of botanical gardens and arboretums in Argentina is intended to include all significant botanical gardens and arboretums in Argentina.

- Administración de Parques Nacionales
- Arboretum Guaycolec y Arboretum de la Facultad de Recursos Naturales
- Utkarsh botanical garden
- Asociación Civil Los Algarrobos
- Bosque Autóctono "El Espinal"
- Facultad de Ciencias Forestales, Universidad Nacional de Misiones
- Fundación Cultural Argentino Japonesa
- Jardín Agrobotánico de Santa Catalina
- Jardín Biológico de América
- Jardín Botánico "Arturo E. Ragonese"
- Buenos Aires Botanical Garden – Jardín Botánico "Carlos Thays"
- Jardín Botánico de Chacras de Coria
- Jardín Botánico de Córdoba
- Jardín Botánico de la Ciudad de Corrientes
- Jardín Botánico de la Facultad de Agronomía de Azul
- Jardín Botánico de la Facultad de Ciencias Agrarias de Esperanza
- Jardín Botánico de la Facultad de Ciencias Forestales de la U.N.S.E.
- Jardín Botánico de la Fundación Miguel Lillo
- Jardín Botánico de la Patagonia Extra-andina
- Jardín Botánico "Dr Miguel J Culaciati"
- Jardín Botánico "El Viejo Molino"
- Jardín Botánico EMETA Chamical
- Jardín Botánico Ezeiza
- Jardín Botánico "Gaspar Xuarez", Universidad Católica de Córdoba
- Jardín Botánico Municipal de San Carlos Centro
- Jardín Botánico Municipal y Area de Emprendimientos Productivos
- Jardín Botánico Oro Verde
- Jardín Botánico Pillahuincó
- Jardín Botánico "Tierra del Sur"
- Jardín Botánico Universidad Nacional de San Luis
- Jardín de Aclimatación del Arido Patagónico
- Jardin de Cactus Catamarca
- Museo de Ciencias Naturales "Augusto G Schulz"
- Parque Botánico "Paul Gunther Lorentz", Catamarca
- Red Argentina de Jardines Botánicos
