= Ventana =

Ventana (Spanish for "window") can refer to:

- Club Hotel de la Ventana, a hotel resort opened in 1911 in Argentina
- Sierra de La Ventana, a small town in Tornquist Partido in Argentina
- Ventana Cave, a National Historic Landmark in Arizona, U.S.
- Ventana Double Cone, a twin mountaintop in the Ventana Wilderness
- Ventana Wilderness, an area in the Santa Lucia Mountains in California
- Ventana Wildlife Society, a non- profit environmental organization in California
- La Ventana, a town in Baja California Sur, Mexico
- La Ventana (yearbook), the yearbook of Texas Tech University in Lubbock, Texas, U.S.
- a fictional nuclear power plant in the 1979 movie The China Syndrome
