= Ernesto Tornquist =

Argentine entrepreneur and businessman

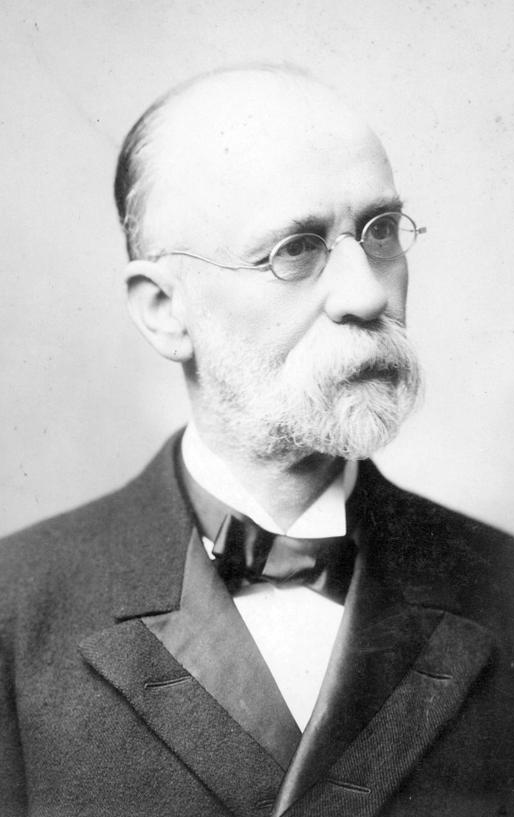
- Born: Ernesto Carlos Tornquist; December 31, 1842; Buenos Aires, Argentina
- Died: June 17, 1908 (aged 65)
- Occupations: Entrepreneur, businessperson
- Notable work: Founder of: Tornquist Bank; City of Tornquist; Plaza Hotel Buenos Aires; Refinería Argentina (sugar mill)

Ernesto Carlos Tornquist (31 December 1842 – 17 June 1908) was an Argentine entrepreneur and businessman, considered to be one of the most important entrepreneurs in Argentina at the end of the 19th century.

The diversified business empire he created played a key role in helping to link Argentina with the trading and financial systems of the first world. Tornquist also founded the Tornquist Bank (Banco de Tornquist), the Plaza Hotel Buenos Aires, the partido of Tornquist and Tornquist its main city, in the south of Buenos Aires Province.

== Early life ==
Born in Buenos Aires in 1842, Ernesto Tornquist was the seventh son of George Tornquist (1801–1876), a Lutheran born in Baltimore, United States and whose parents came from a German family in the city of Hamburg with roots in Karlskrona in Sweden. The father was consul of the city of Bremen in Montevideo, Uruguay, and was an importer and property investor in Buenos Aires. His mother, Rosa Camusso Alsina, a Catholic, was born in Buenos Aires in 1805 and died there of yellow fever in 1871.

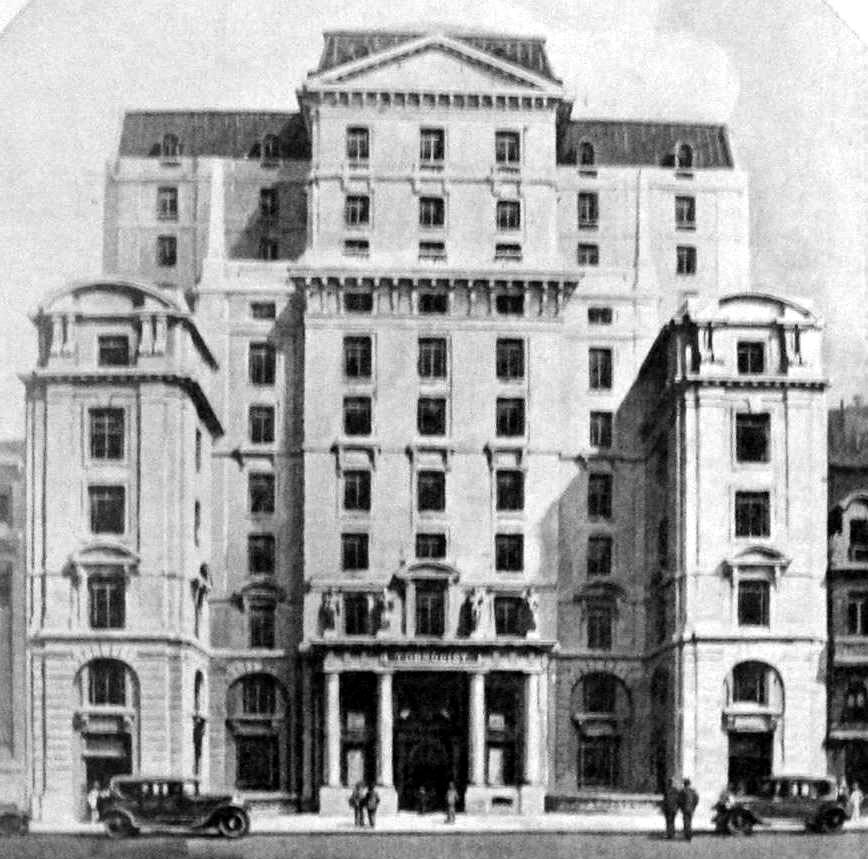
The Tornquist Bank building in Buenos Aires, c. 1928

Tornquist started his schooling at Escuela Evangélica Alemana and in 1856 was sent to study in Germany in the city of Krefeld for two years.

== Career ==
On his return to Argentina he took up a job working for a company directed by his brother-in-law which exported wool and leather and imported agricultural machinery. In 1872 he married his niece, Rosa Altgelt Tornquist in Buenos Aires, and in 1874 took over the running of his brother-in-law's company which was now renamed, Ernesto Tornquist y Cia. With the help of Belgium capital the company diversified its activities to include investment in the sugar, meat-salting and cold-storage industries. The company also invested in railways and acquired land in the provinces of Santa Fe and Entre Rios, previously occupied by Indians. In the 1880s he set up a large sugar refinery, Refineria Argentina, in Rosario. Other initiatives included founding the Palermo brewery, the Seeber margarine manufacturer and the Bianchetti scale manufacturer.

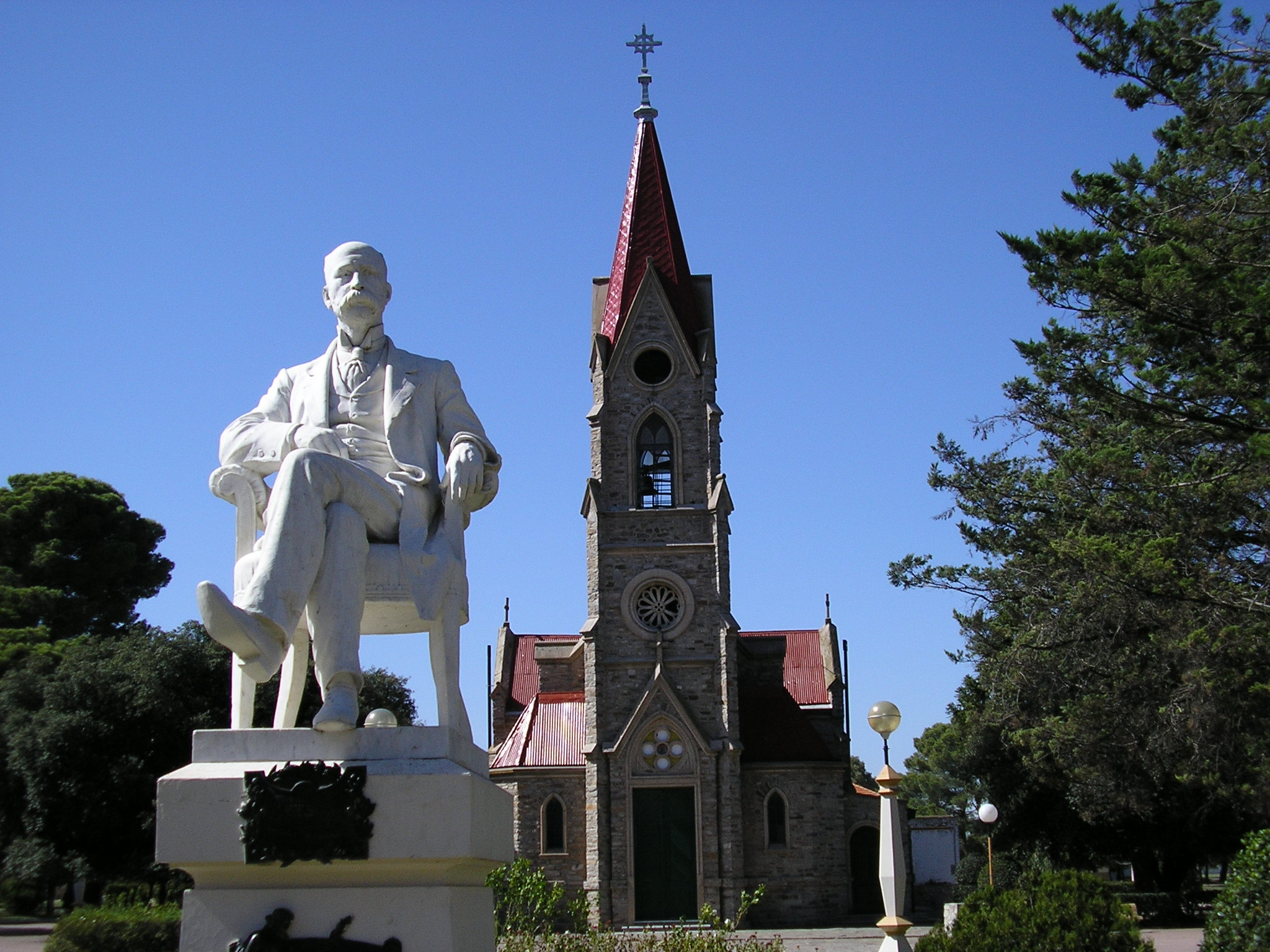
Statue of Tornquist in the homonymous city in Buenos Aires Province founded by him in 1883

On 17 April 1883 he founded Tornquist, the main city of Tornquist Partido, in the south of Buenos Aires Province. From the beginning the town was organized as an agricultural colony for German and Volga German immigrants. After the economic crisis of 1890 he took charge of organizing the recovery of the company Sansinena and its cold-storage plant La Negra in Riachuelo and set up the plant Cuartreros in Bahía Blanca.

Amongst other activities the Tornquist group organised the hunting of whales (not controversial in those days) around the South Georgia Islands through the Compañía Argentina de Pesca, oil exploration in Mendoza, the exploitation of quebracho in Santiago del Estero and the construction of the Ferrocarril del Norte de Santa Fe with the help of Belgium capital.

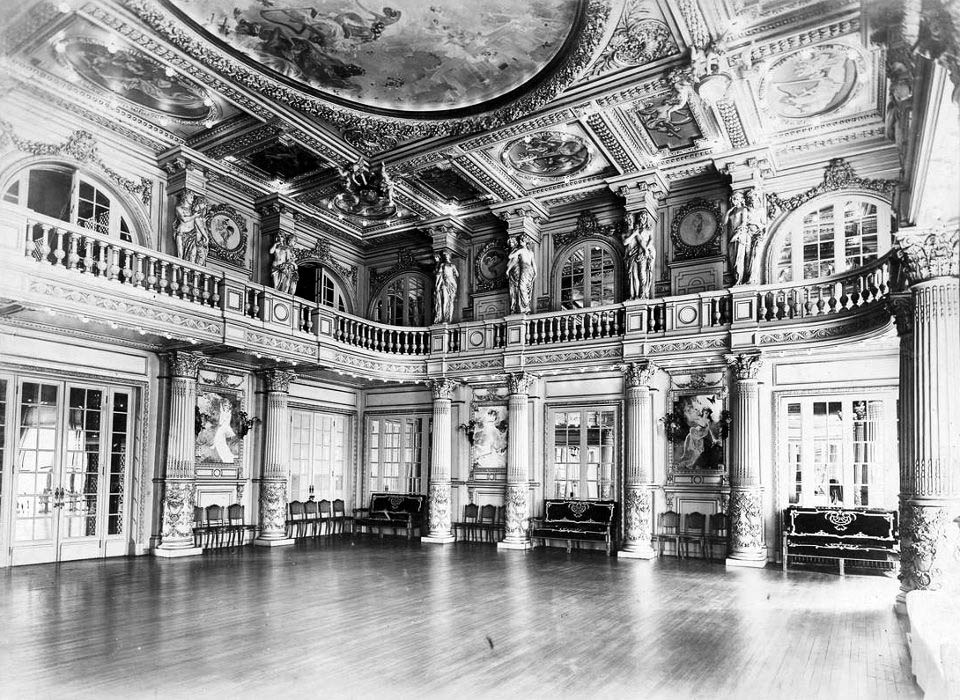
Hall of the Plaza Hotel c. 1910. The hotel was commissioned by Tornquist to German architect Alfredo Zucker

Ernesto Tornquist played a crucial role in helping to avoid a war between Argentina and Chile in 1902 by managing the British mediation in the border dispute, and by strongly opposing the bellicose Foreign Minister Estanislao Zeballos. He represented the German armaments group Krupp in Buenos Aires where he organised a strong lobby for the armaments industry, whilst on the other hand he helped to resolve a conflict with Brazil.

In 1903 he built the estancia, Sierra de la Ventana, in Tornquist, designed by the German immigrant architect Carlos Nordmann in Gothic style typical of German castles in the Rhine Valley. The grounds were designed by the French immigrant landscape architect, Carlos Thays.

== Death and legacy ==
He maintained a close friendship with Argentine presidents Julio A. Roca and Carlos Pellegrini and tenaciously opposed the militaristic plans of the War Minister Estanislao Zeballos during the presidency of José Figueroa Alcorta (1906–1910).

He died in 1908 in Buenos Aires and since 1980 his remains are buried in the local church in the town of Tornquist.

He built the Plaza Hotel Buenos Aires, which opened one year after his death, in 1909. Designed by the German architect Alfred Zucker, it is located on Florida street, overlooking Plaza San Martin.

== Bibliography ==
- Altgelt, Carlos A., and María Florencia Acuña. El ancho camino se bifurca: La descendencia de Adam Altgelt y Laura Tornquist a 150 años de su casamiento. Private edition, 2003.
- Del Solar, Alberto. "Don Ernesto Tornquist y los pactos con Chile (Datos para la historia)." La Nación, 20 June 1908.
- Floria, Carlos A., and César A. García Belsunce. Historia política de la Argentina contemporánea (1880–1983). Madrid: Alianza Universidad, 1992.
- Guzmán, Yuyú. "Un castillo gótico alemán en medio del paisaje serrano." La Nación, 23 July 2005.
- Madero, Fernando M. "Ernesto Tornquist." In Gustavo Ferrari and Ezequiel Gallo (eds.), La Argentina del Ochenta al Centenario, 628–631, 634–637. Buenos Aires: Sudamericana, 1980.
- Scandizzo, Delfor Reinaldo. El gringo Pellegrini. Buenos Aires: Corregidor, 1997.
