= Sierra de La Ventana =

Sierra de La Ventana may refer to:

- Sierra de La Ventana (town)
- Sierra de la Ventana (mountains)
