= Villar Residence =

Coordinates: 34°35′45″S 58°22′36″W

- Residencia Villar
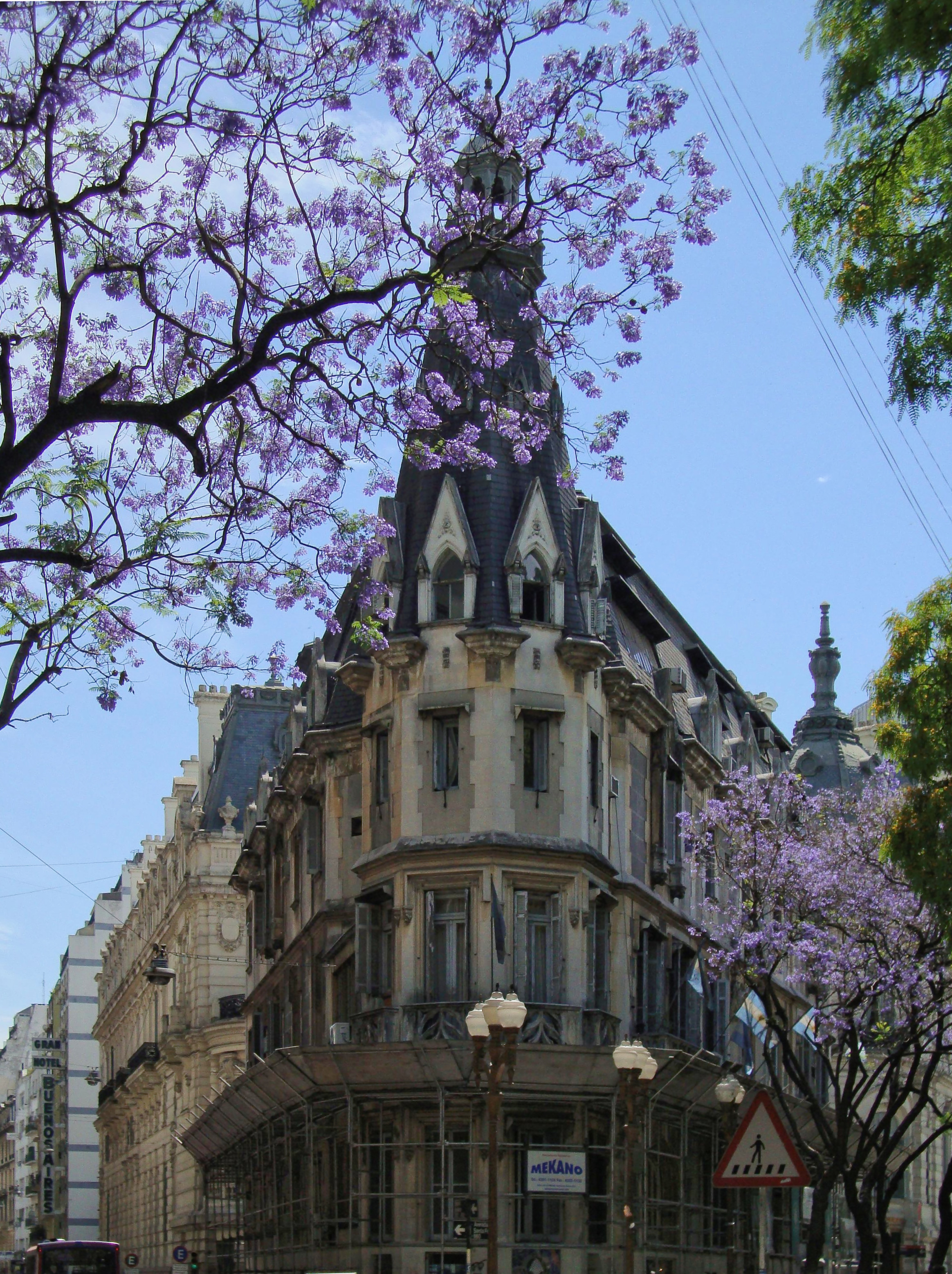
- View from Av. Santa Fe
- Interactive map of the Villar Residence area

General information
- Type: Palace
- Location: Santa Fe 690, Buenos Aires, Argentina
- Current tenants: National Parks Administration (1935–present)
- Completed: c. 1883; 143 years ago
- Owner: Reinaldo Villar (1881–1908), then his descendants until 1935; Banco Popular Argentino (1935–1942); National Parks Administration (1942–present)

Design and construction
- Architects: Giuseppe Maraini (original); Passeron and Brizuela (renovation)

National Historic Monument of Argentina

The Villar Residence, mistakenly called Haedo for many years, is a 19th-century building in the Retiro neighborhood of Buenos Aires, Argentina. It is located on Avenida Santa Fe, to the southwest of the Torre Monumental and across the street from Plaza San Martín, in close proximity to the Plaza Hotel. It was built as a residence for colonel Reinaldo Villar (1830-1908), a wealthy landowner from Entre Ríos province, and his family.

== History ==
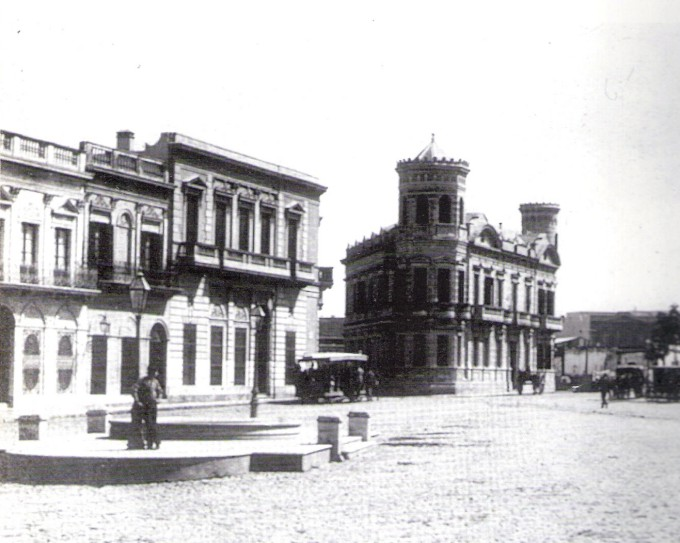
Early view of the building (c. 1890)

Colonel Villar bought from the Haedo family in 1881 a single-story, old house, located in this peculiar, triangular city block. Divided into several lodgings, it belonged to José Braulio Haedo, who according to the 1869 National Census was living in San Fernando, Buenos Aires province. Tenants rented out the different rooms. After his death, the property passed to his brother Mariano F. Haedo and to three nephews from another brother, neither of whom lived there. The deed of sale of July 18, 1881, before public notary Manuel Salas, proves they were the sellers and that the property changing hands was that old, single-story house.

The new building commissioned by colonel Villar was designed by Swiss engineer Giuseppe Maraini. It resembled a twin-tower Italian castle; fitted out as a villa suitable for a wealthy family, it was among the first major buildings in the northern part of the city.

Many years after his death, between 1928 and 1930, his daughter Dominga Villar, nicknamed Numa, commissioned architects Passeron and Brizuela to transform the building into a French Neo-Gothic castle that would not have been out of place on the shores of the Loire river in France.

After Ms. Villar's death in November 1931, the building was mortgaged and by 1935 it had come under the ownership of the Banco Popular Argentino. It was then rented by the National Parks Administration, who purchased it in October 1942. It has been a listed historic monument since 2001.

Today, the strangely shaped triangular edifice bounded by Maipú, Avenida Santa Fe, and Marcelo T. de Alvear, although still owned by the National Parks authority, now known as the "Administración de Parques Nacionales"., is surrounded by scaffolding. An integral refurbishment of the building started in 2023 with an estimated cost of AR$ 580 million.

== Listed building ==
Since 2001, under Bill 25.427, the building has been listed as a national historic monument.
