= Tucumán Government Palace =

Executive office building of the Government of the Province of Tucumán

Coordinates: 26°49′49″S 65°12′19″W

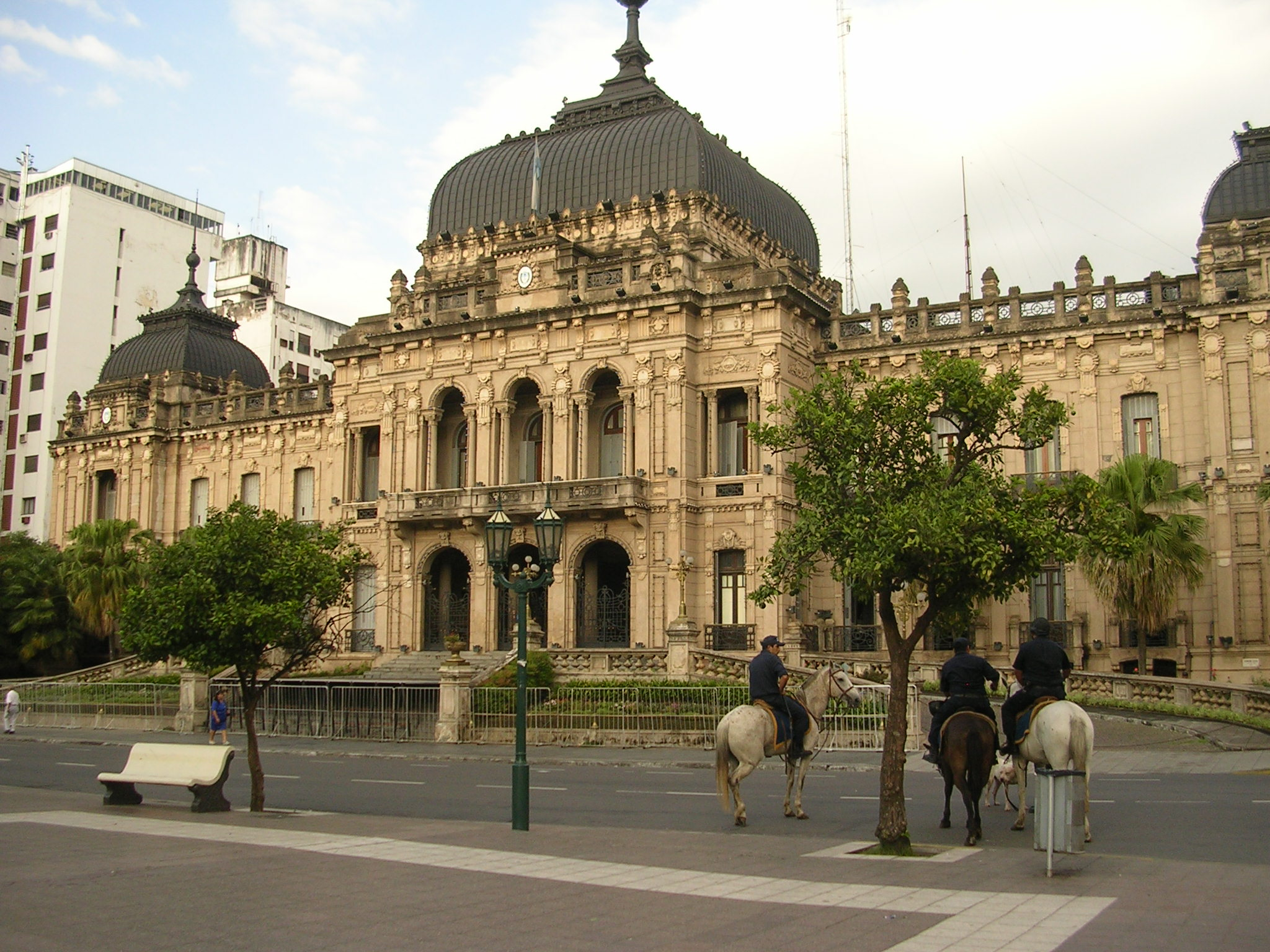
The Tucumán Government Palace

The Tucumán Government Palace is the executive office building of the Government of the Province of Tucumán.

== Overview ==
Tucumán Province, the most populous and economically important in the Argentine Northwest, lacked architecturally significant government offices, early in the 20th Century. As both a remedy to that absence and a means to encourage urban renewal and development in the provincial capital city of San Miguel de Tucumán, the Governor, Luis F. Nougués, organized the construction of a government palace to replace the colonial cabildo then still serving as his offices. The cabildo housed not only the governor's offices; but also a courtroom and small jail.

The governor commissioned local architect Domingo Selva, whose design was an eclectic form of French baroque, with an Italianate influence. Following the cabildo's demolition two adjoining properties were purchased, and construction on the palace began in 1908. Completed in 1910, the new government palace was inaugurated on July 9, 1912, in a ceremony led by the Governor, Dr. José Frías Silva, and the President of Argentina, Roque Sáenz Peña.

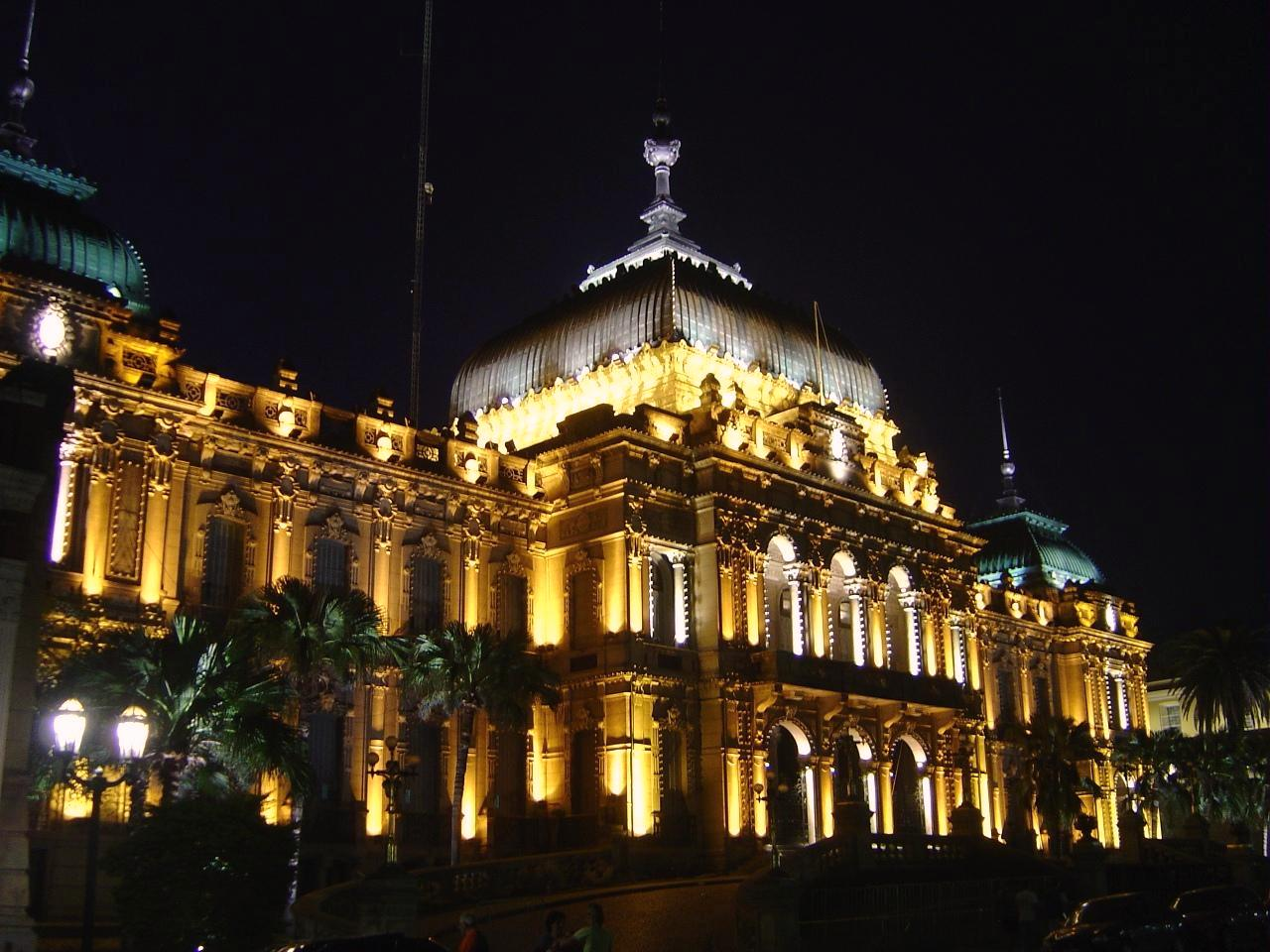
The palace at night

Facing Plaza Independencia, the city's central square, the building remains one of the most architecturally significant in the region. Its grandiose exterior is matched by an ornate interior, which is probably best known for its salón blanco ("white room"). Used historically for official ceremonies, the white room features spiderweb chandeliers and ceiling panels decorated by the Spanish artist, Julio Vila y Prades (recently restored by local sculptor Santos Legname).

The remains of one of Tucumán's most distinguished sons, Juan Bautista Alberdi, were transferred from their La Recoleta Cemetery resting place (in Buenos Aires) and returned to the province on August 28, 1991, when they were placed in a crypt built for the occasion in the government palace's basement. The palace is open for guided tours.
