= Tornquist Partido =

Tornquist Partido de Tornquist
- Department
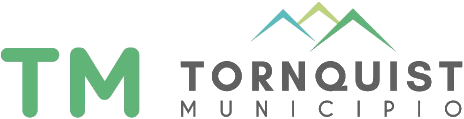

- location of Tornquist Partido in Buenos Aires Province
- Coordinates: 38°06′S 62°13′W
- Country: Argentina
- Established: 1910
- Founder: Ernesto Tornquist
- Seat: Tornquist

Government
  - Intendant: Estefanía Bordoni (UP)

Area
  - Total: 4,184 km^{2} (1,615 sq mi)

Population
  - Total: 11,759
  - Density: 2.810/km^{2} (7.279/sq mi)
- Demonym: tornquistense
- Postal Code: B8160
- IFAM: BUE125
- Area Code: 0291
- Website: tornquist.gob.ar

Tornquist Partido is a partido in the southwest of Buenos Aires Province in Argentina and is named after Ernesto Tornquist, founder of Tornquist, the partido's main city.

The provincial subdivision has a population of about 12,000 inhabitants in an area of 4,184 km^{2} (1,615 sq mi), and its capital city is Tornquist, which is 634 km (394 mi) from Buenos Aires.

== Economy ==
The economy of Tornquist is dominated by farming, the main agricultural products are: wheat, barley, oats, maize, sunflower, soybeans and sorghum.

There is also large scale production of beef and dairy products, and smaller scale production of pork, chicken, sheep and honey.

== Settlements ==
- Berraondo
- Chasicó
- Choique
- Estomba
- García del Río
- Nueva Roma
- Pelicura
- Saldungaray
- Tornquist
- Sierra de La Ventana
- Villa Serrana La Gruta
- Villa Ventana
