= Plaza San Martín (Buenos Aires) =

Square in Buenos Aires, Argentina

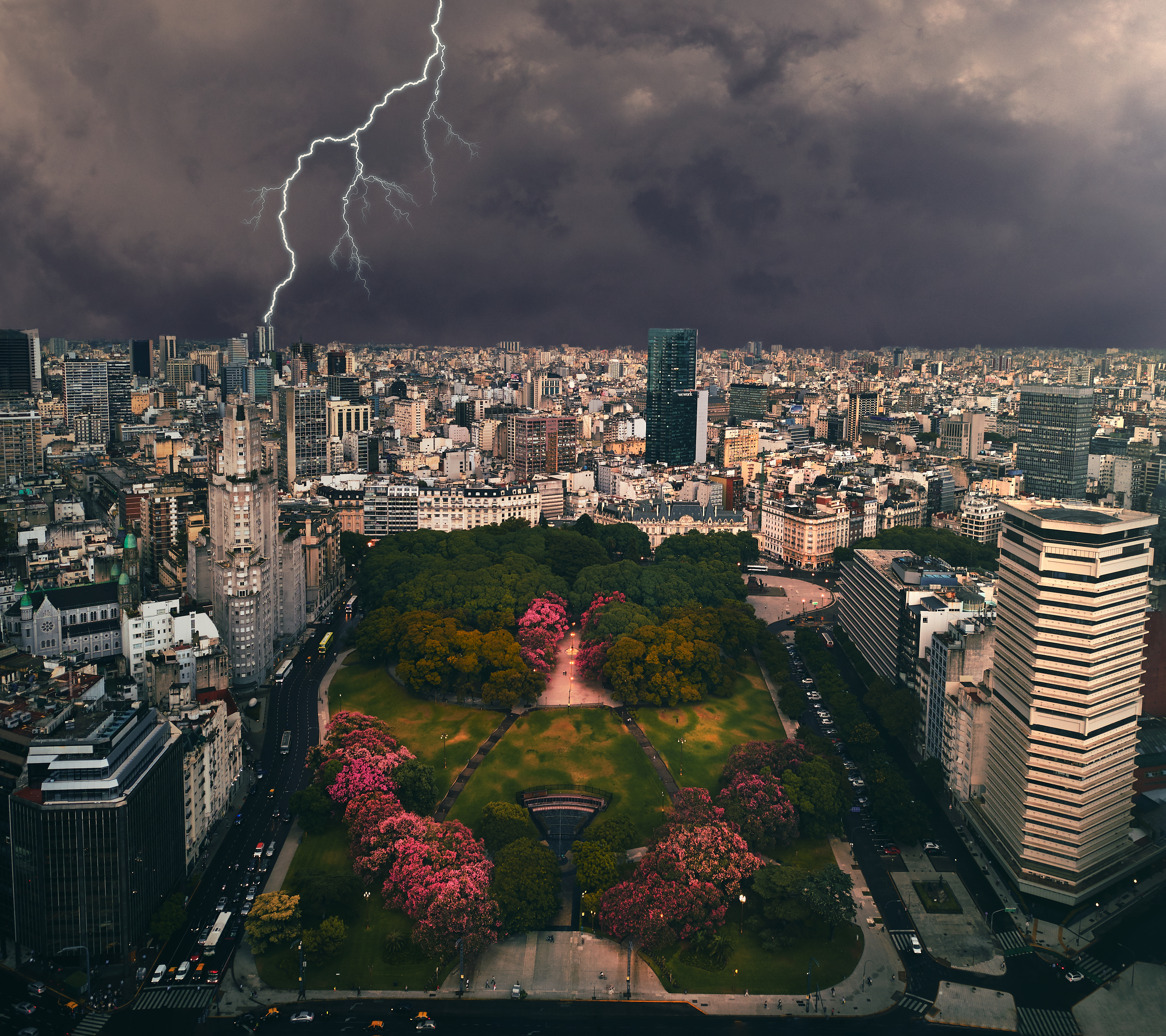
Bird's-eye view of Plaza San Martín in 2018.

Plaza San Martín (English: San Martín Square) is a park located in the Retiro neighbourhood of Buenos Aires, Argentina. Situated at the northern end of pedestrianized Florida Street, the park is bounded by Libertador Ave. (N), Maipú St. (W), Santa Fe Avenue (S), and Leandro Alem Av. (E). Its coordinates are 34°35′42″S 58°22′32″W.

== History ==
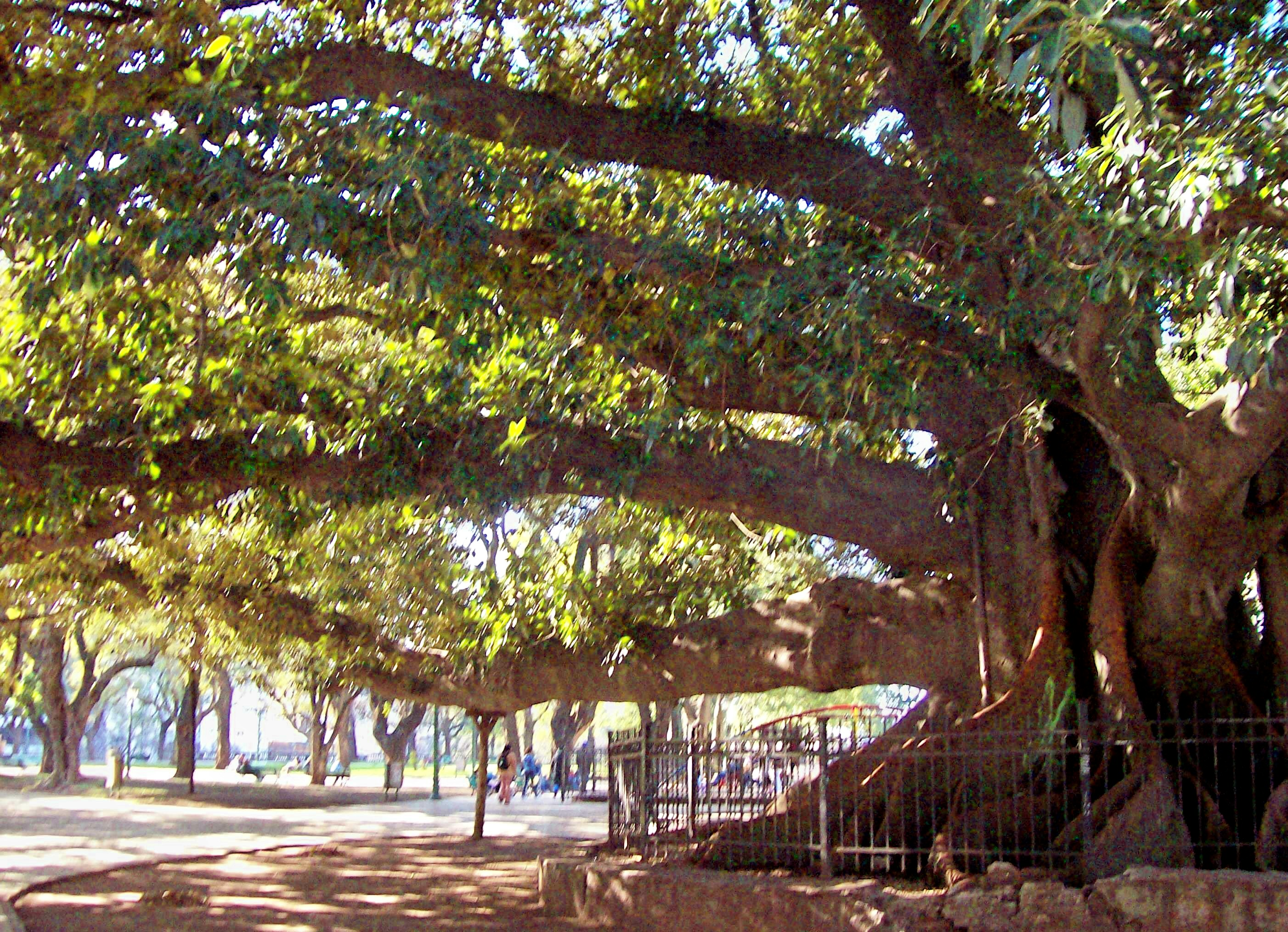
Plaza San Martín's great Ombú tree

A succession of colonial Spanish governors had their official residences built on what today is the plaza and, in 1713, the land was sold to the British South Sea Company. The South Sea Company operated their slave trade out of the former governor's residence and a fort and bullring were later built nearby. The land was the site of Gen. John Whitelocke's 1807 defeat upon Britain's second attempt to conquer Buenos Aires, whereby the area became known as the "Field of Glory". The Revolution of 1810 brought an autonomous government to Buenos Aires, which entrusted the Mounted Grenadiers to José de San Martín and allowed him to establish his main barracks at the plaza. An 1813 resolution abolished the slave trade in the United Provinces of the Río de la Plata and the slave quarters were shuttered. Following his decisive military victories, Gen. San Martín was forced into exile in 1824 for political reasons; but a reappraisal of his place in history led to his becoming nearly eponymous in Argentina after his death in 1850. Accordingly, French sculptor Louis-Joseph Daumas was commissioned in 1862 to create an equestrian statue of the hero of the Wars for Independence and the square was renamed in his honor in 1878, upon the hundredth anniversary of his birth.

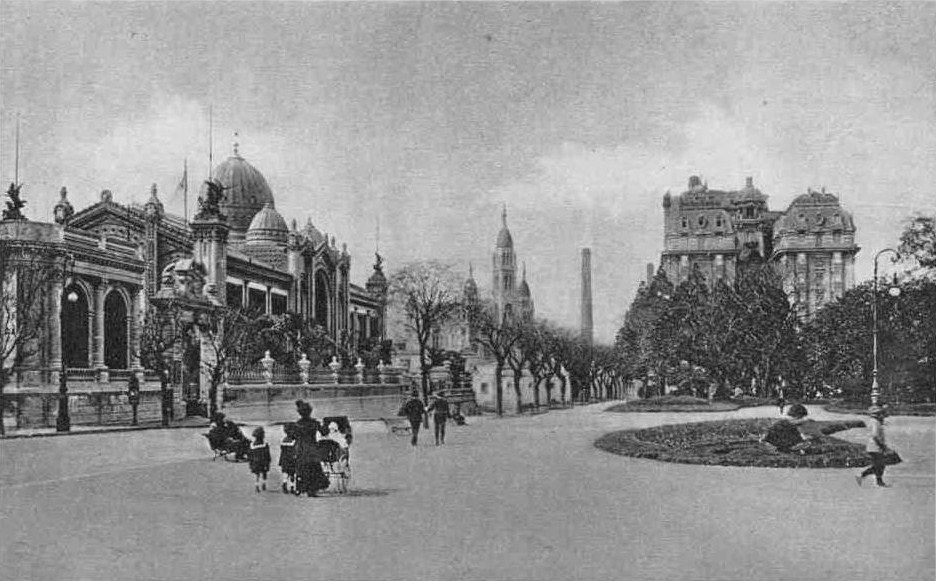
View of Plaza San Martín in 1920, when the Argentine Pavilion (left) still graced the park as an art museum

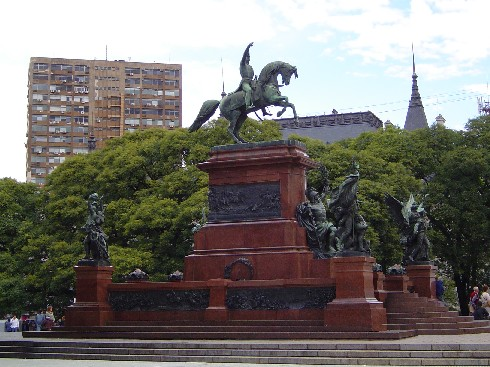
Monument to José de San Martín, the plaza namesake.

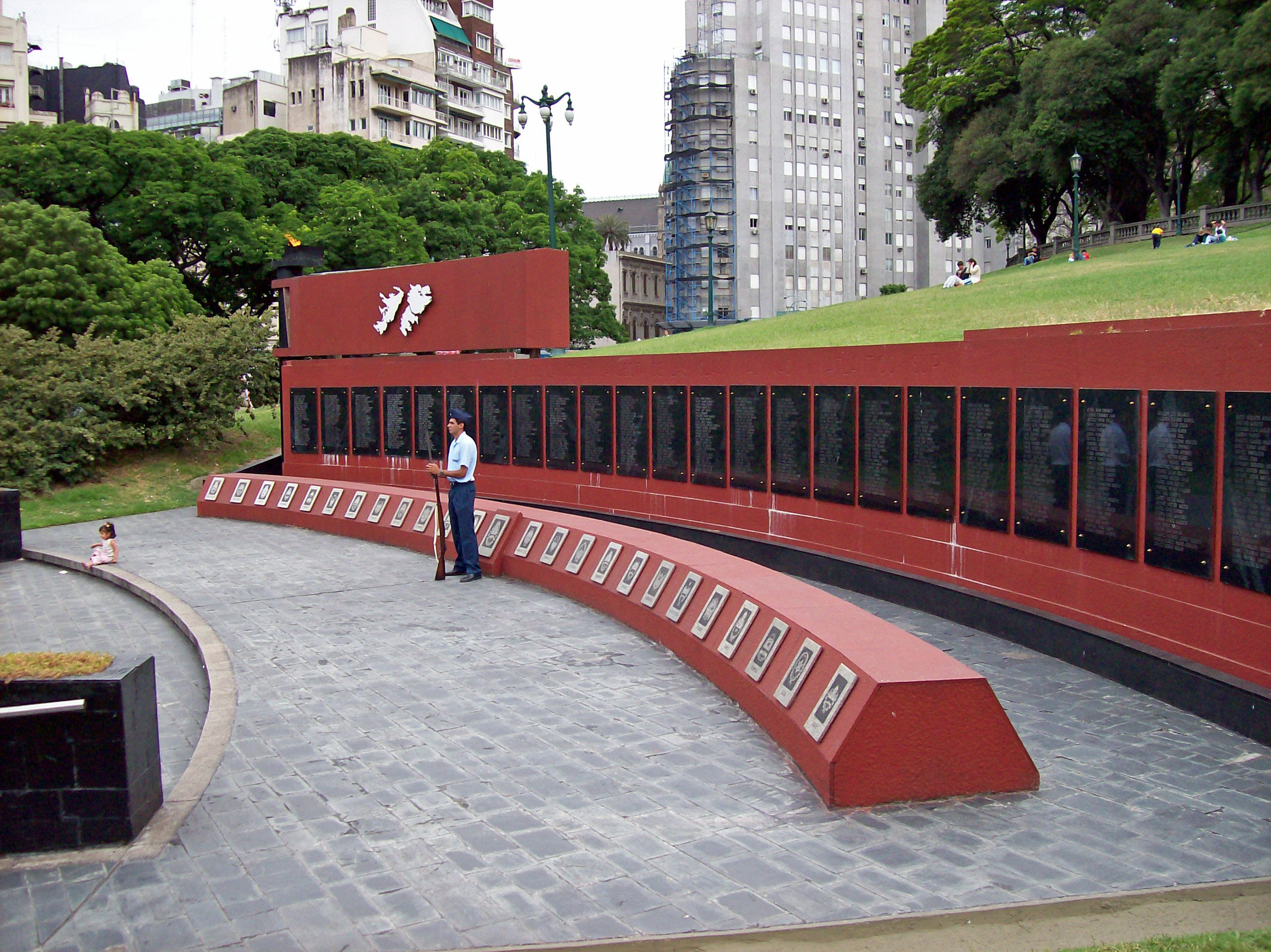
Monumento a los caídos en Malvinas (Monument for the fallen in the Malvinas War) is located in Plaza San Martin

Following remodeling works by British architect Edward Taylor and Argentine architect José Canale, the fort, bullring and other buildings were demolished in 1883 by order of Mayor Torcuato de Alvear, converting the area into a plaza. Numerous Ombú, Linden and Floss Silk trees were planted. The same administration also shaped the Plaza de Mayo, nearby and in 1889 French urbanist Charles Thays was commissioned to give the plaza its approximate current form (among numerous other designs he left Argentina over the next twenty years). The plaza became the preferred surroundings for some of Argentina's wealthiest landowners around 1900. Three architecturally significant mansions facing the plaza surviving today were the Beaux Arts San Martín Palace (today the ceremonial annex of the Foreign Ministry), the Second Empire Paz Palace (today the Military Officers' Association) and the Neogothic Haedo Palace (today the offices of the National Parks Administration).

The park was the site in 1909 of the inaugural of both the first premier hotel in Argentina (the Plaza) and of the new National Museum of Fine Arts, for which the glass and steel pavilion used at the 1889 World's Fair in Paris was enlisted; structurally inadequate, the pavilion was demolished in 1932, however. Plaza San Martín and its surroundings acquired their current physiognomy in 1936, when Charles Thays' son, Carlos León Thays, designed the esplanade surrounding the monument and when the 33-story Art Deco Kavanagh Building was completed. Though the surrounding area has since seen much of its older architecture replaced by high-rises (notably the 1975 Pirelli building), the plaza has remained timeless. Its western section was separated to make way for a rerouting of Maipú Street in 1972; but President Néstor Kirchner ordered the change reverted in 2004, in response to long-standing appeals by neighbours and friends of the park.

== Events ==
In spring 2009 an exhibition of the "United Buddy Bears" was held in the park, for the first on the American continent. The exhibition consisted of more than 140 bear sculptures, each two metres high and designed by a different artist.
