= Julio Vila y Prades =

Spanish painter and muralist

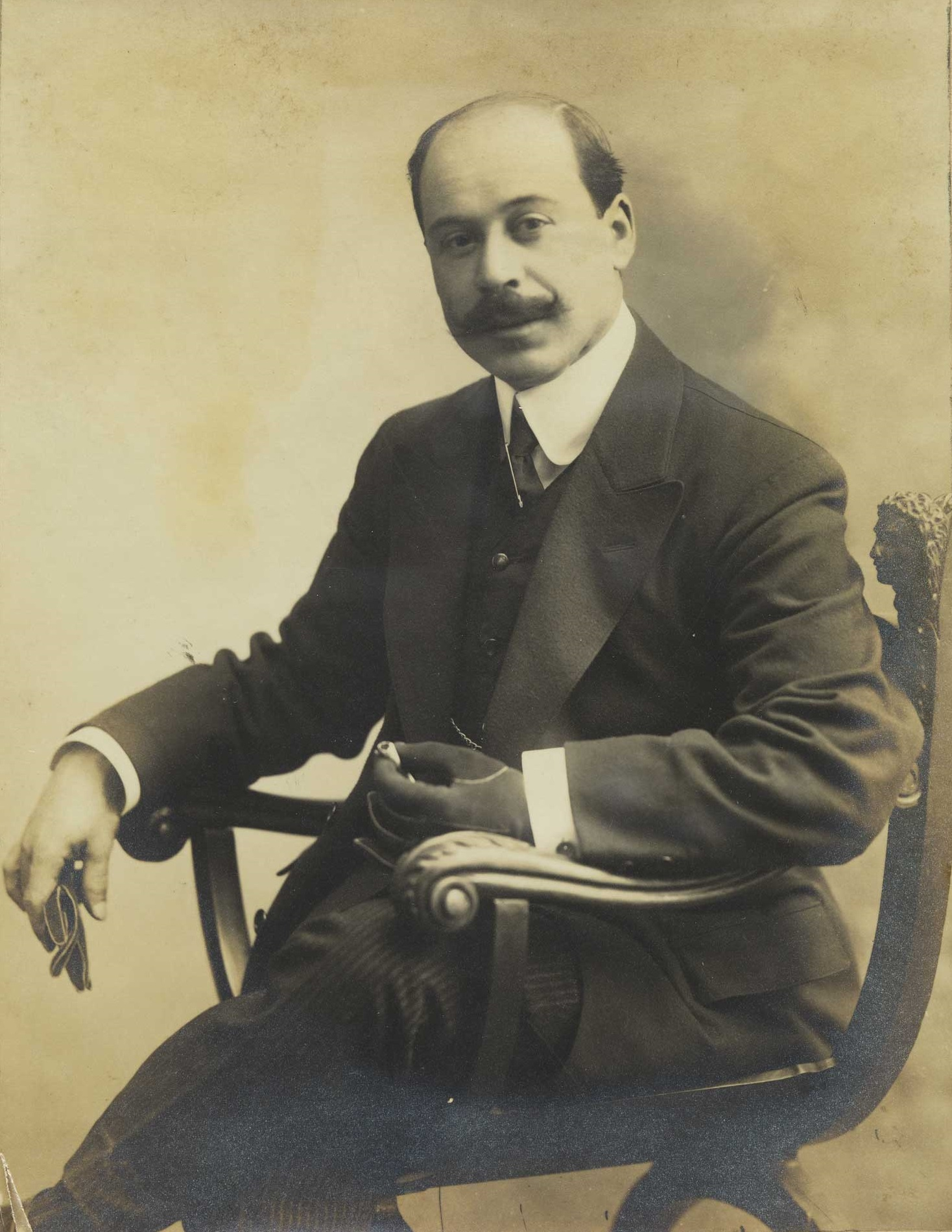
Julio Vila y Prades (1912);

Julio Vila y Prades (9 April 1873, Valencia - 9 July 1930, Barcelona) was a Spanish painter and muralist who also worked throughout Latin America.

== Biography ==
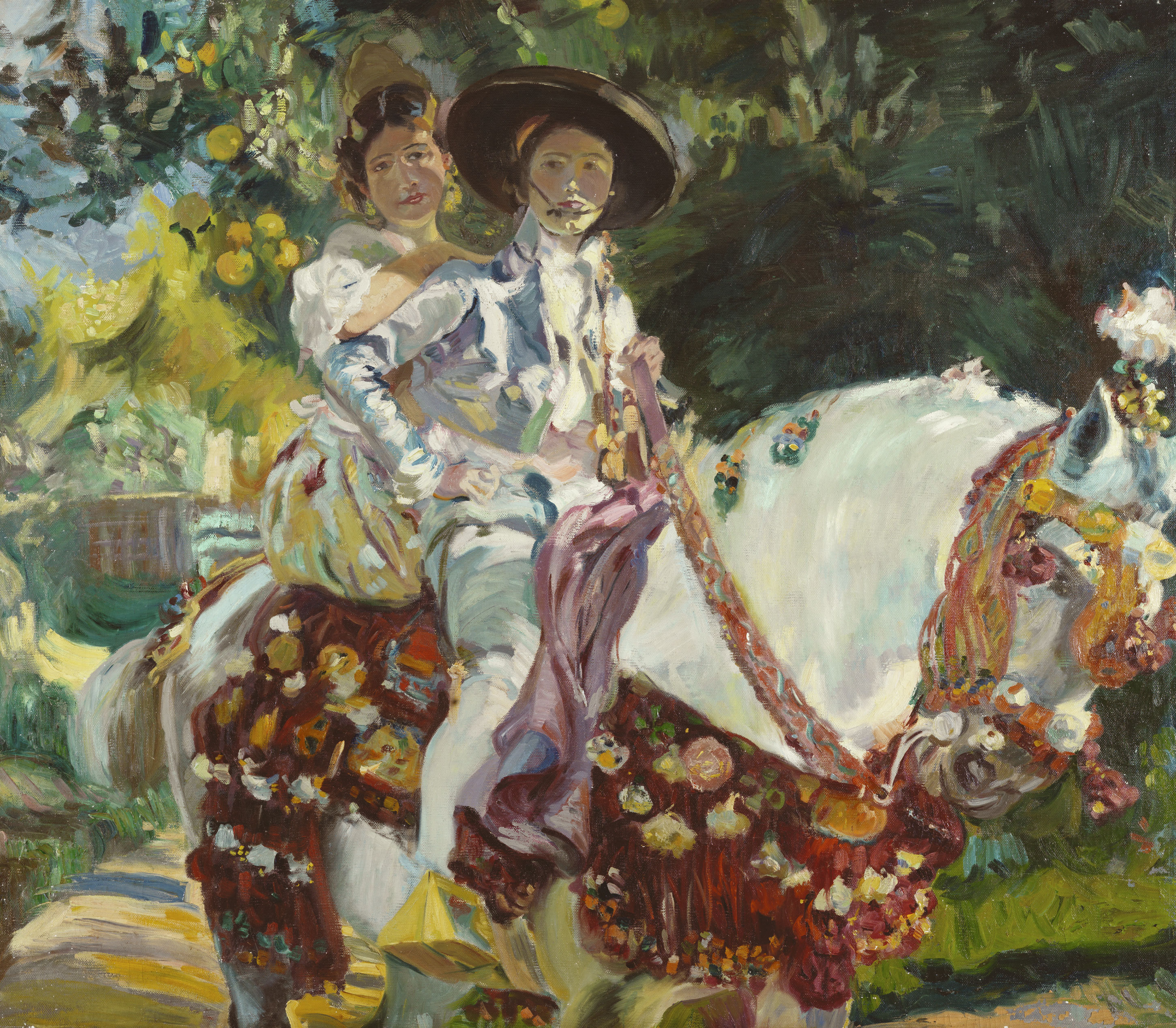
Valencianos (Joaquín Sorolla's children)

Against his parents wishes, he began his artistic studies at the Real Academia de Bellas Artes de San Carlos with Francisco Domingo Marqués and Joaquín Agrasot. He then went to Madrid and was an assistant in the workshop of Joaquín Sorolla from 1893 to 1904.

He was a frequent participant at the National Exhibition of Fine Arts, where he took honorable mention in 1892 and 1897 and won a medal in 1904 for his painting, On Rice. That same year, he went to Paris and spent a short time studying at the Académie Julian.

Expressing a desire to visit South America, his friend Sorolla contacted the Catalan businessman and art promoter, José Artal (1862-1918), who was based in Buenos Aires. With his support, Vila went to Argentina, where he painted landscapes and genre scenes on the pampas. He returned to Europe in 1906, spending some time in Brittany, then visiting Madrid, where he made drawings at the wedding of King Alfonso XIII.

In 1908, following the death of his mother, he went back to Buenos Aires and married José (soon to be "Count") Artal's daughter, Carmen, who was fifteen years his junior. Over the next few years, he travelled throughout Argentina, receiving several commissions for decorative works, including the ceiling at the Tigre Club, and murals at the Plaza Hotel and the Tucumán Government Palace. He also produced numerous portraits.

Plans to move to Paris were quashed by the beginning of World War I and his family settled in San Sebastián instead. He continued to travel, however, working in New York, Havana, Caracas and Mexico City. He returned to Spain in 1921 and painted the ceiling of the new Gran Kursaal de San Sebastián (since demolished). After that, he went to Peru, to do on-site sketches for a mural of the Battle of Ayacucho, to be placed in the new Bolivarian Museum in Caracas. The year 1924 found him in San Francisco, painting a ceiling mural, The Apotheosis of the California Soldier, for the theater at the Legion of Honor museum.

In 1928, he moved his workshop to Barcelona, so his wife could be closer to her family. That same year, the Peruvian government awarded him the Order of the Sun, although the mural that had been commissioned would remain unfinished at his death, two years later.

== Selected paintings ==
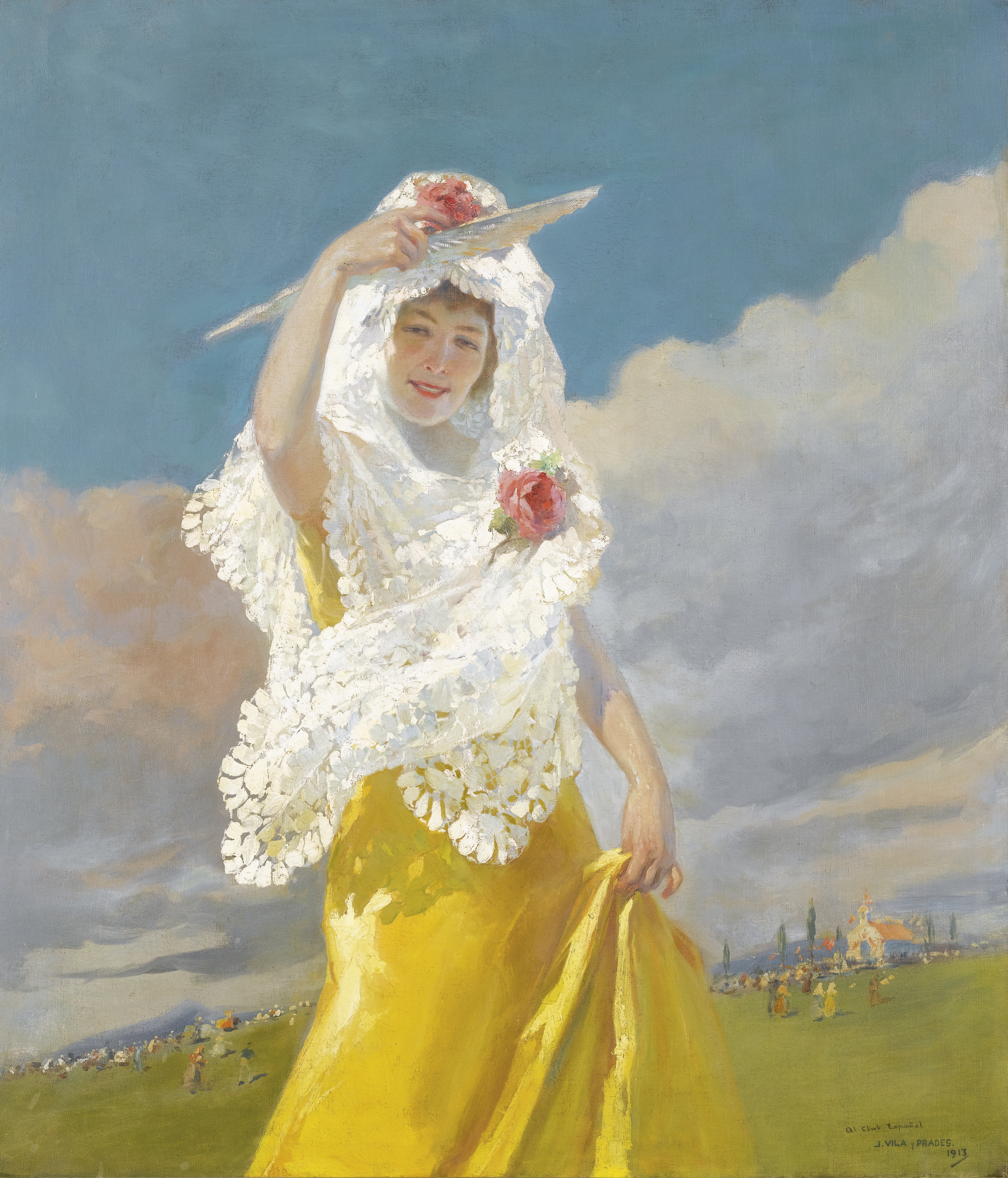
Spanish Woman with Mantilla

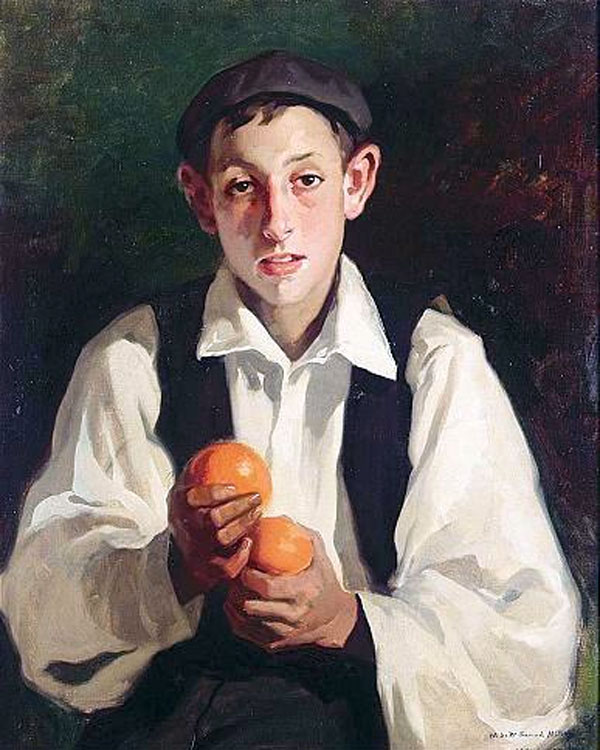
Boy with Oranges

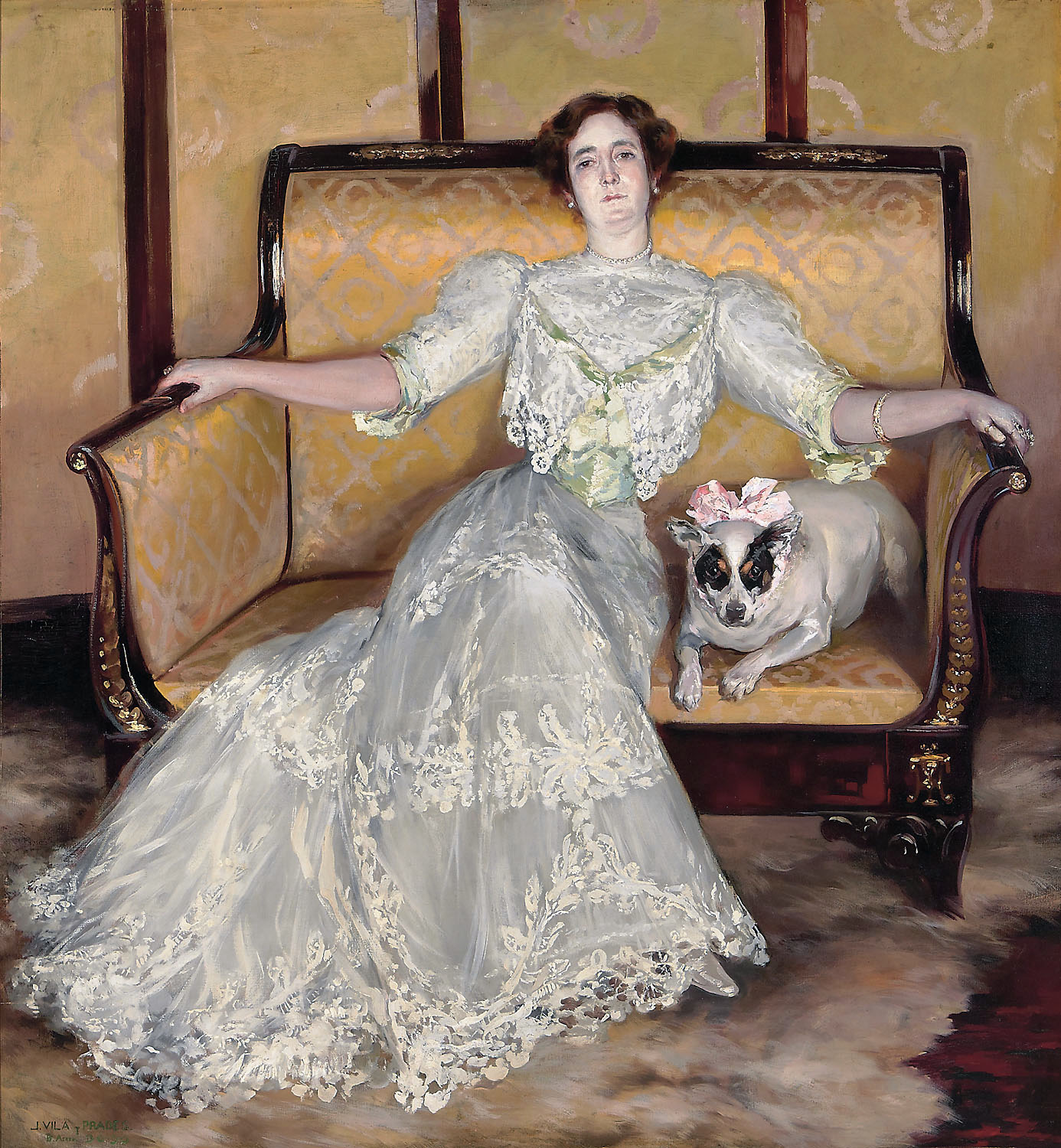
Woman with Dog

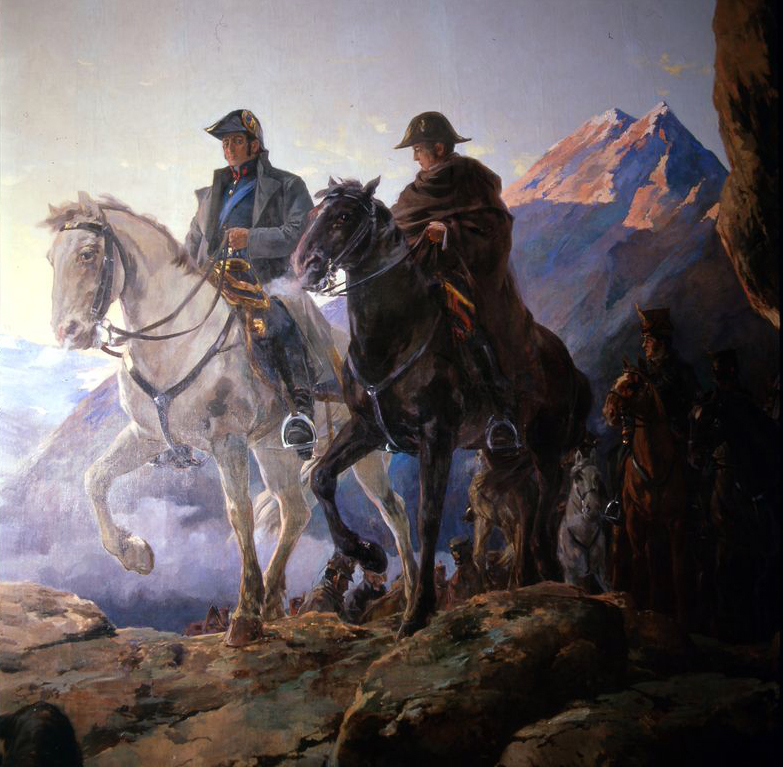
Army of the Andes
Crossing the Cordillera
