= Tornquist, Buenos Aires =

Tornquist
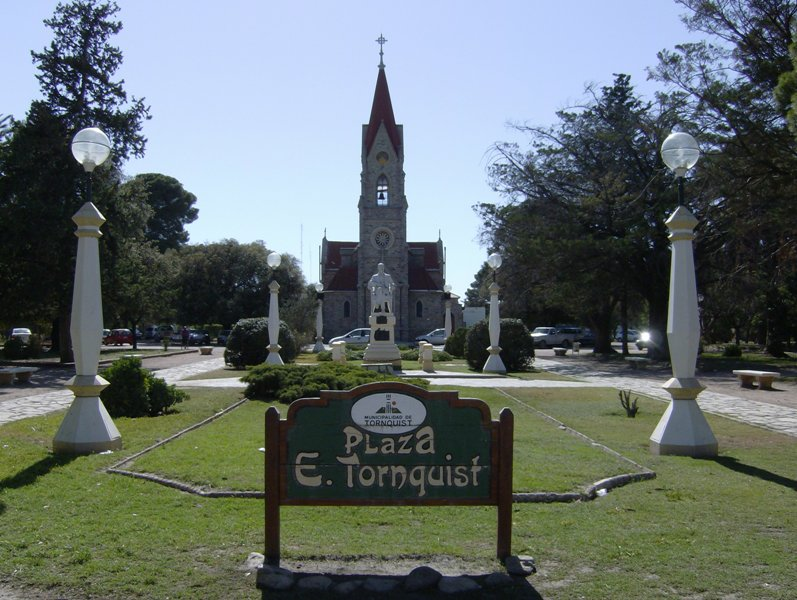
- Tornquist Plaza
- Interactive map of Tornquist
- Coordinates: 38°06′S 62°13′W
- Country: Argentina
- Province: Buenos Aires
- Parish: Tornquist
- Founded: 1883
- Elevation: 276 m (906 ft)

Population (2017)
  - Total: 7,600 (est.)
- CPA Base: B 8160
- Area code: +54 291

Tornquist is a town in Buenos Aires Province, Argentina. It is the head town of the Tornquist Partido.

== History ==
The settlement was founded on 17 April 1883 by Ernesto Tornquist and was settled by Germans and Volga Germans. Historically, the economy was based on livestock and agricultural production and was later supplemented by a growing tourism sector related to the scenic Ventana System, a minor mountain range of 195 km (121 mi) NW to SE that dominates the flat countryside. The development of the railway favored the city's future and prominent community centers were established along ethnic ties, such as the headquarters of the Germanic Society, the Hogar Funke (a summer home for elderly Germans), and the Barraca Funke.

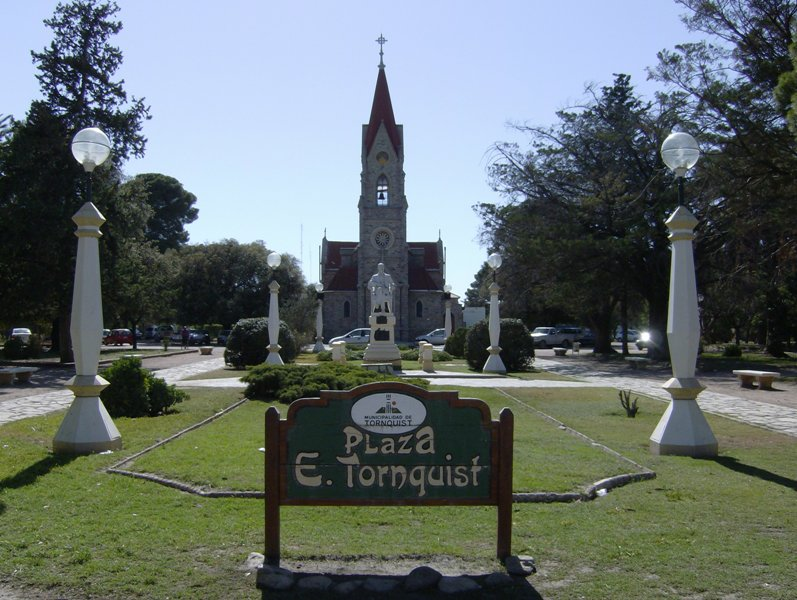
Plaza Ernesto Tornquist with the church at centre.

== Urban development ==
The city's most important municipal, educational, civic, and commercial activities center around Ernesto Tornquist Plaza. The plaza fully occupies four city blocks and contains a man-made pond on the north end along 9 de Julio Avenue. The Iglesia Santa Rosa de Lima, a neo-Gothic chapel, is situated in the middle of the plaza boasting a singular tower about five storeys tall.

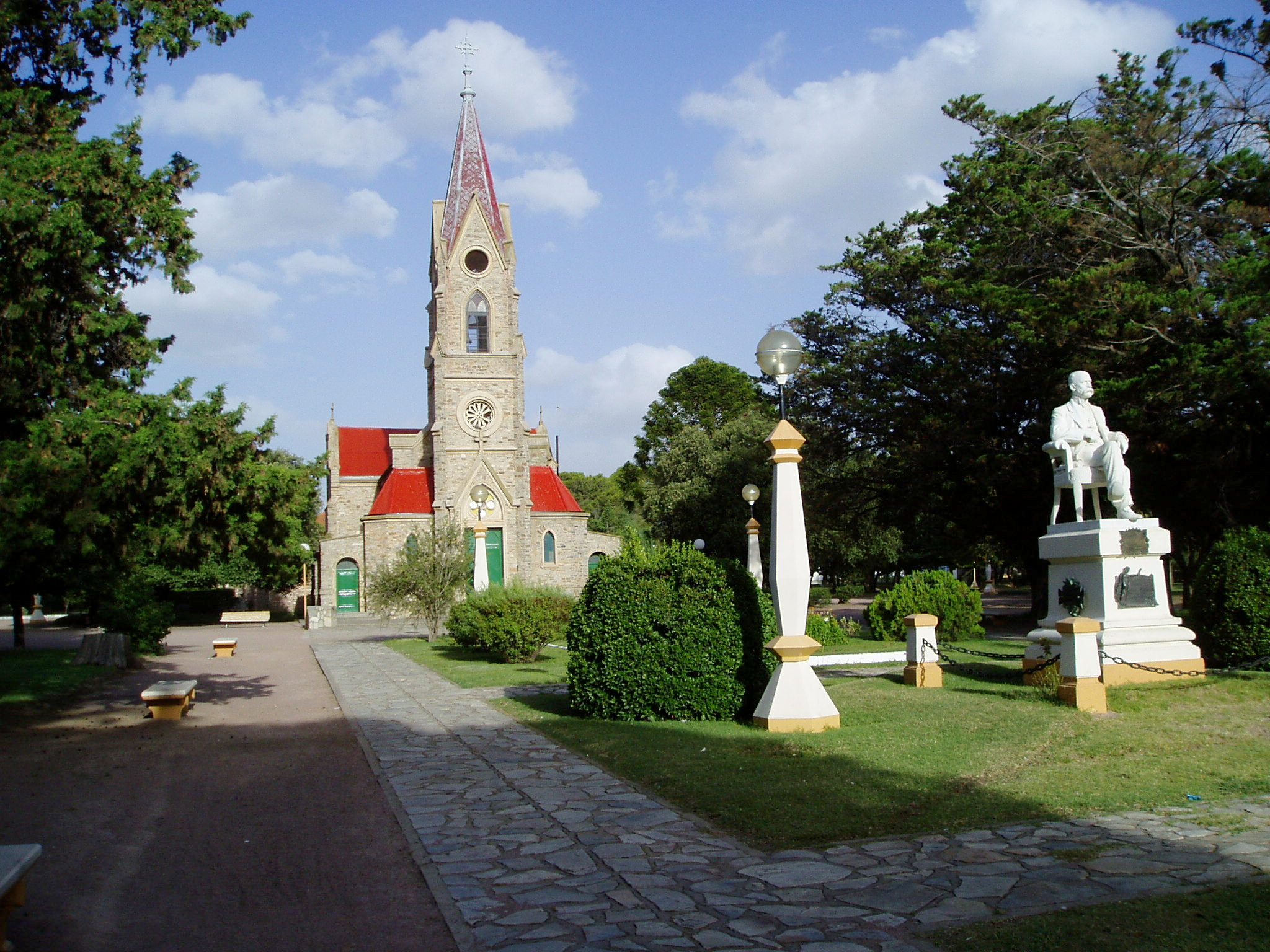
Another view of Plaza Ernesto Tornquist

The layout of the historic centre, the design of the main square, the layout of its church, and the composition of the landscape, are reminiscent of German towns and architecture, a nod to the origins of the town's first settlers.

The original plans for the city were prepared by Pablo Mayer, an engineer, whose work was commissioned by the city's founder himself. The city hall was designed and built by the Italian-Argentine architect Francisco Salamone in the 1930s, under the provincial government of the conservative Manuel Fresco.
