= Club Hotel de la Ventana =

Former hotel in Buenos Aires, Argentina

Coordinates: 38°06′14″S 61°56′14″W

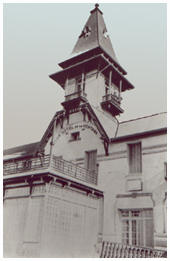
Club Hotel de la Ventana, shortly after its 1911 opening

Club Hotel de la Ventana was a large, luxurious hotel resort, built by the Buenos Aires Great Southern Railway and opened in 1911 near Villa Ventana, 17 km from the town of Sierra de La Ventana, in the southeast of the Province of Buenos Aires, Argentina.

== History ==
The resort was designed by the Italian architect Antonio Gherardi, who also designed the customs house in the nearby city of Bahía Blanca. Construction began in 1904, under the direction of the architects Gaston Luis Mallet and Jacques Dunant, with bricks provided by Ernesto Tornquist, a prominent entrepreneur. The hotel had a luxurious interior and rivalled the best hotels in the world at that time. It could accommodate 350 guests and had 173 rooms and four large suites. Features included a solarium, a restaurant for 600 decorated in Louis XVI style, a winter garden, a ballroom with 150 seats where films could be shown, three casino halls, a night club, two beauty salons, a tower with a panoramic view over the surrounding mountains, a concert hall, a well-stocked library, a polo field, a chapel, an 18-hole golf course, a football pitch and three tennis courts. There was also a riding stable, a swimming pool, a hospital, a pharmacy, a hair dresser, and a large gymnasium. The resort was set in a park of 126 hectares designed by the French-born Argentine architect and landscape designer Carlos Thays who included a wide variety of European trees.

The inauguration on November 11, 1911, which included a Catholic Mass and a banquet, was attended by 1200 distinguished guests including the British Ambassador, Lord Barrington, the President of Brazil, General Campos Salles, the Prince of Wales, Robert I. Runciman and the President of Argentina, Julio Argentino Roca, who described the hotel as "The marvel of the century". The hotel was opened to the public on 1 December 1911. A 21 km narrow gauge (2 ft 6in) railway line, built to connect the resort to the Buenos Aires Great Southern Railway station in Sierra de la Ventana, was opened on 17 December 1913, and there was a daily connecting service to and from Estación Constitución in Buenos Aires.

The resort began to suffer large losses from 1913 onwards due to the world economic depression and the outbreak of war in Europe. In spite of this, however, a large celebration was held here on July 9, 1916, to mark the centennial of the Argentine Declaration of Independence. Guests included the Crown Princess of Spain, the Prince of Wales later to become King Edward VIII, Brazilian President Hermes Rodrigues da Fonseca, and many other high-ranking figures of state and diplomats.

On November 3, 1917, gambling was prohibited in Argentina by a decree issued by President Hipólito Yrigoyen. Three years later, in 1920, the mostly English owners of the resort decided to close it, and the company they had set up to manage the resort went into liquidation. On November 30, 1924, the Provincial government took over the hotel with a plan to use it as a holiday centre for students, teachers and their families, a plan that was never put into action. Later the hotel was looted, with everything from fine wines in the wine cellar to the valuable furniture disappearing,

At the start of the Second World War in 1939, the Battle of the River Plate, involving the German pocket battleship Admiral Graf Spee and the British cruisers Exeter, Achilles and Ajax, ended with the captain of the Graf Spee, Hans Langsdorff, scuttling his ship in the harbour of Montevideo in Uruguay. On December 22, 1939, over 1,000 sailors from the Graf Spee were taken to Buenos Aires, and some of them were later interned by the government in the hotel until 1946. For a brief period the hotel came to life again and some restoration work was carried out.

With the return of the crew to Germany the Hotel fell into disrepair and eventually in 1978 demolition began. On July 8, 1983, a fire destroyed most of the remaining hotel and today the site lies in ruins.
