= Plaza Hotel Buenos Aires =

Hotel in Buenos Aires, Argentina

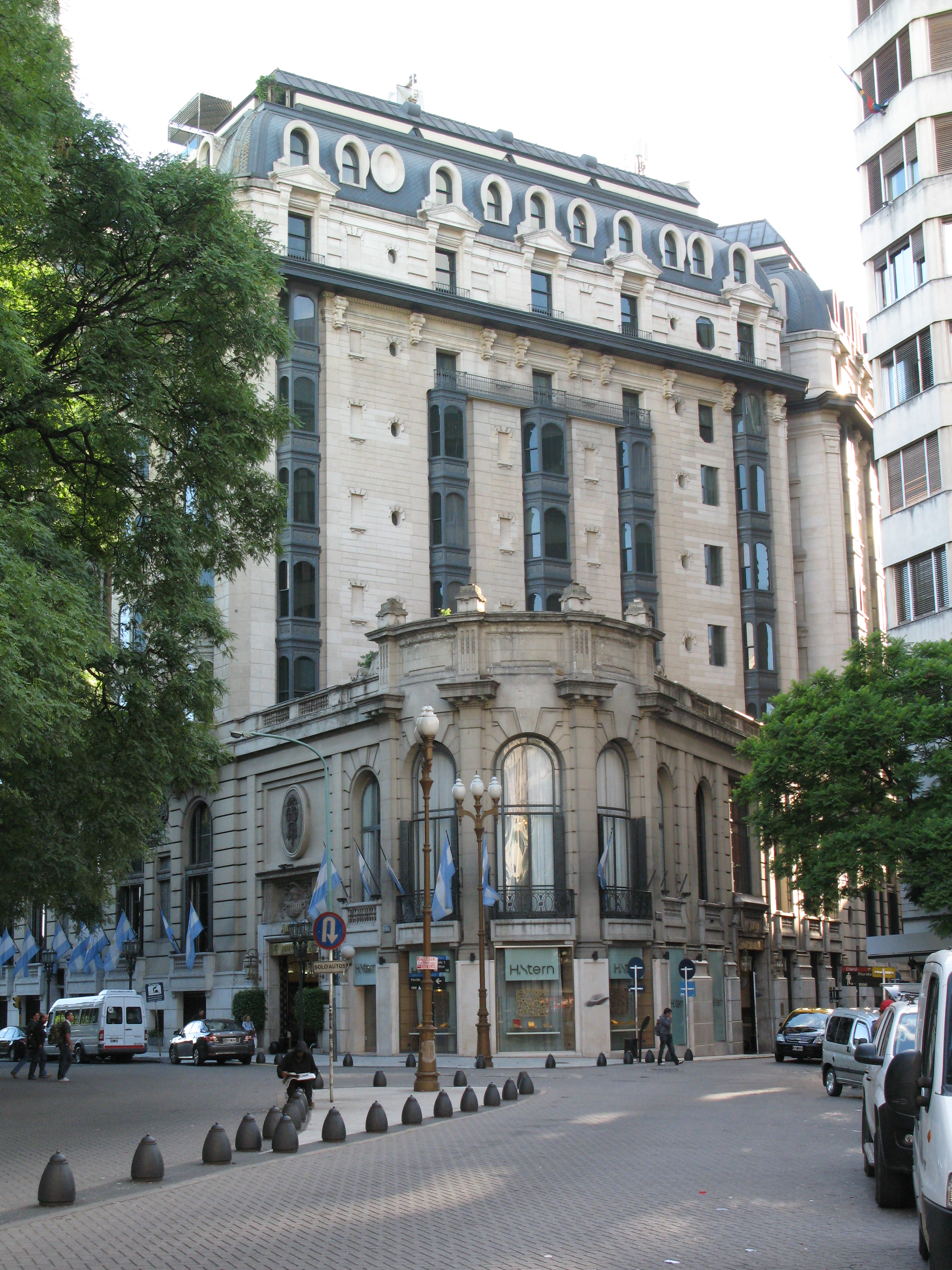
- Hotel facade in 2013
- Interactive map of the Plaza Hotel Buenos Aires area
- Former names: Plaza Inter-Continental (1981–1982); Marriott Plaza Hotel Buenos Aires (1994–2013)

General information
- Status: Closed for redevelopment
- Type: Hotel
- Location: Florida 1005, Buenos Aires, Argentina
- Coordinates: 34°35′46″S 58°22′29″W
- Inaugurated: 15 July 1909
- Renovated: 1934, 1977
- Closed: 30 April 2017
- Client: Ernesto Tornquist
- Owner: Grupo Sutton Dabbah (2013–present); Ernesto Tornquist and descendants (1909–2013)
- Operator: InterContinental (1981–1982); Marriott (1994–2013)

Height
- Height: 63 m (207 ft)

Technical details
- Floor count: 9

Design and construction
- Architect: Alfred Zucker

Renovating team
- Architects: Clorindo Testa and Héctor Lacarra (1977)

The Plaza Hotel Buenos Aires is a historic hotel in the Retiro district of Buenos Aires, Argentina, at the northern end of Florida Street and overlooking Plaza San Martín. Commissioned by the banker Ernesto Tornquist and designed by the German-born architect Alfred Zucker, it opened on 15 July 1909, ahead of the centennial celebrations of 1910, and was then the tallest building in Buenos Aires. It has been described as the first five-star hotel in Argentina.

The hotel belonged to Tornquist's descendants for over a century. It operated within the InterContinental chain in the early 1980s and, from 1994 until its sale in 2013, as the Marriott Plaza Hotel under Marriott management. Its guests included heads of state, royalty, and performers, among them Theodore Roosevelt, Charles de Gaulle, Enrico Caruso, and Maria Callas. The hotel closed on 30 April 2017. The building is being redeveloped as a complex of residences and a new hotel, scheduled to open in early 2028.

== History ==
=== Construction and early years ===
The Plaza was developed by Tornquist in anticipation of the crowds of tourists expected for the 1910 Argentina Centennial celebrations. The nine-story hotel was designed by the German-born architect Alfred Zucker and built at the northern end of Florida Street, facing Plaza San Martín. Tornquist died in 1908 and did not see the hotel finished. It was inaugurated on 15 July 1909, and President José Figueroa Alcorta was its first guest. The 63-metre (207 ft) building was then the tallest in the city; the neighboring Kavanagh Building, completed in 1936, eventually surpassed it.

The hotel opened with 160 rooms and 16 suites, which had central heating, electric light, telephones, and elevators. The London houses of Thompson & Company and Waring & Gillow supplied the furniture; marble sculptures by the German artist Gustav Eberlein and ceiling paintings by the Spanish painter Julio Vila y Prades decorated the interiors. The Plaza has been described as the first five-star hotel in Argentina and South America.

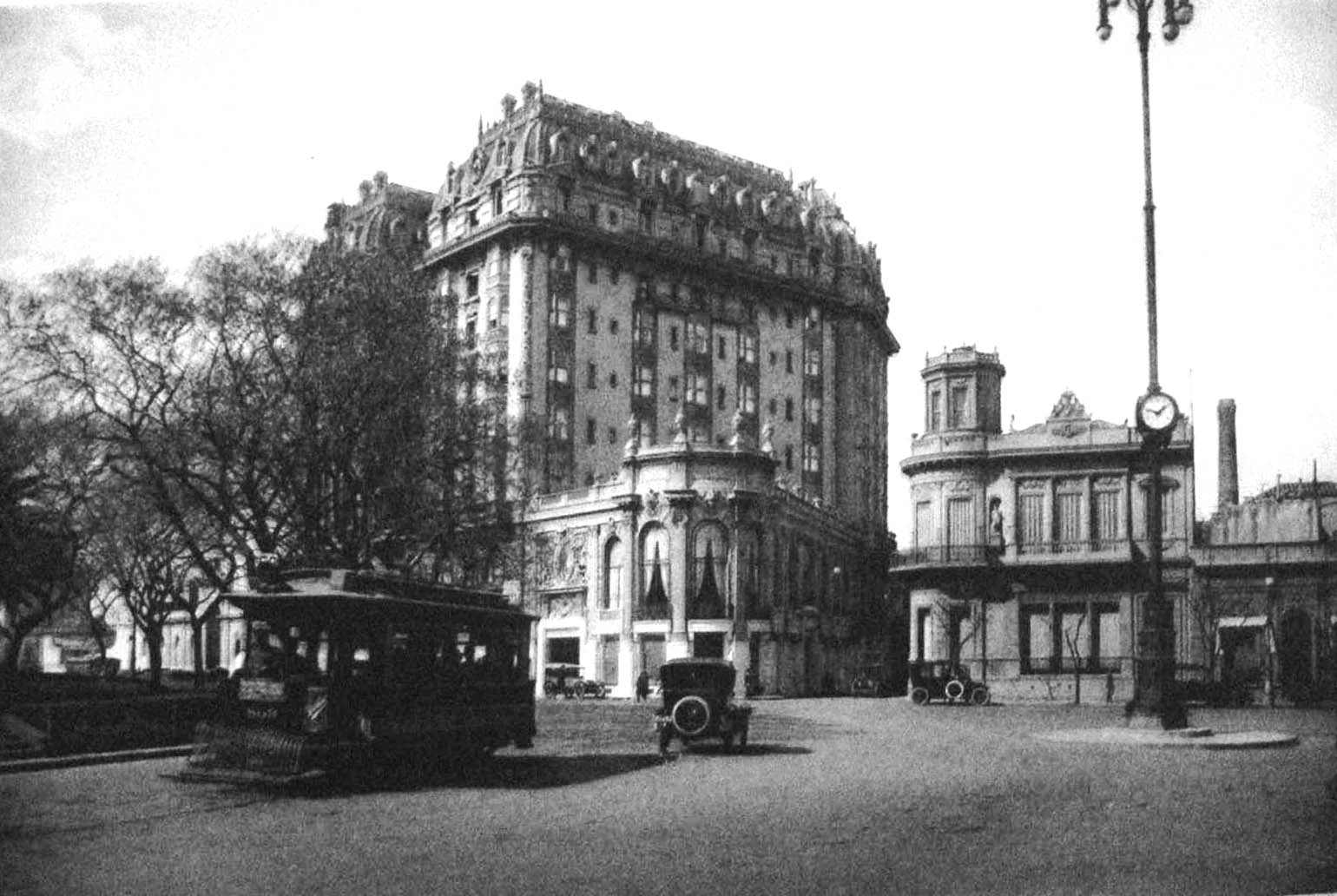
The hotel in the 1920s, with the annex building at right

In the original plans, a neighboring lot separated from the hotel by a side street appears as a garden; by the 1920s a smaller annex building stood there. The main building has an extensive basement and sub-basement. A carriage entrance, today a central element of the facade, was added in 1913. The hotel was remodeled in 1934, when Art Deco elements were introduced during a modernization. Between 1942 and 1948, a large annex was built at the rear of the hotel along San Martín Street. When the Philippine legation in Argentina, the first Philippine diplomatic mission in Latin America, opened in April 1949, it was initially based in the hotel.

=== Later 20th century ===
In 1977, the architects Clorindo Testa and Héctor Lacarra expanded the hotel's capacity ahead of the 1978 FIFA World Cup; rooms and bathrooms were updated at the same time. The hotel was part of the InterContinental chain from 1981 to 1982 as the "Plaza Inter-Continental". Marriott Hotels assumed management in 1994 and the hotel was renamed the "Marriott Plaza Hotel Buenos Aires", while ownership remained with Tornquist's descendants. After a modernization under Marriott, the hotel offered 267 rooms and 38 suites, along with a business center, a swimming pool, and a gymnasium. It was renovated ahead of its 100th anniversary in 2009, which was celebrated with tours for local residents and a book about its history.

=== Closure and redevelopment ===
In April 2013, a family company of 65 descendants of Tornquist sold the hotel to the Grupo Sutton Dabbah (Note: The Sutton Dabbah family, associated with the Alvear group, also owns the Llao Llao and Alvear Icon hotels and the Galerías Pacífico shopping mall.) for 280 million pesos (about US$48 million at the time); the hotel left Marriott and returned to its historic name. It served guests for the last time on 30 April 2017 and closed for a complete renovation. Its furnishings and contents were sold to the public in 2021.

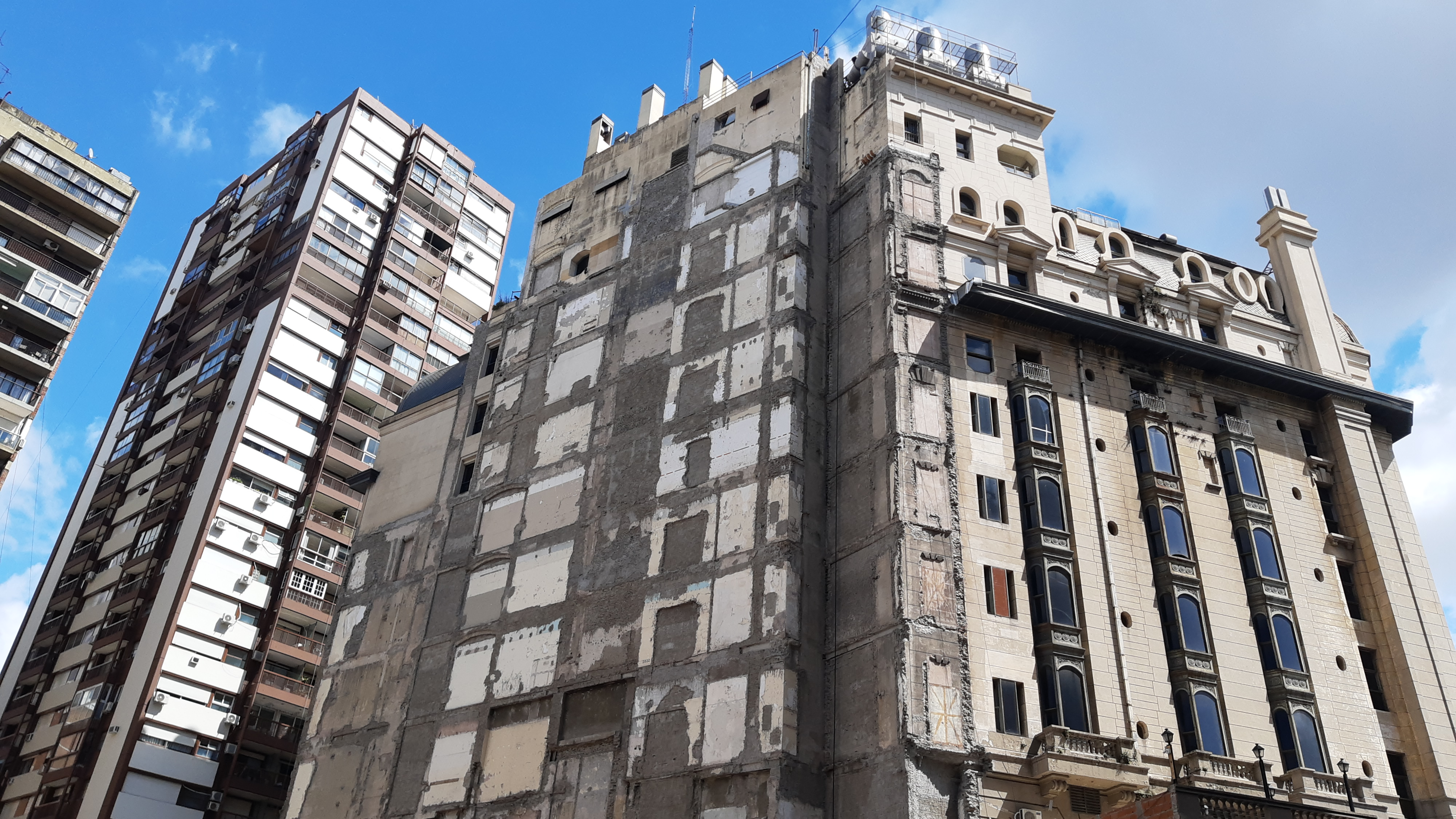
Rear view in 2023, after demolition of the annex

Plans announced in 2021 and 2022 called for converting the original building into luxury residences, with the project designed by BMA, an architecture firm based in Argentina, Chile, and Miami. The 1940s annex was demolished in 2022 to make way for a 12-story hotel structure. The project, with an investment estimated between US$130 and 150 million, is to combine about 200 hotel rooms with some 55 private residences; the reopening is scheduled for early 2028. The interior design was assigned to the Buenos Aires designer Martín Zanotti, who attributed phoenix-themed decorations found in the old hotel to Tornquist, who had reportedly considered naming it the "Fénix". The building is protected within a historic-protection area of Retiro; the preservation specialist Fabio Grementieri advises the project and leads the restoration of the exteriors.

== Notable guests ==
The hotel housed visiting royalty, heads of state, and performers throughout its history. Its guests included Theodore Roosevelt, Charles de Gaulle, François Mitterrand, Indira Gandhi, Shah Mohammad Reza Pahlavi and Empress Farah Pahlavi of Iran, King Juan Carlos I and Queen Sofía of Spain, and the Prince of Wales. Performers and artists who stayed at the Plaza include Enrico Caruso, Arturo Toscanini, Maria Callas, Plácido Domingo, Luciano Pavarotti, Edith Piaf, Maurice Chevalier, Louis Armstrong, Nat King Cole, Clark Gable, Walt Disney, Gina Lollobrigida, Omar Sharif, Gregory Peck, John Travolta, and Mikhail Baryshnikov, as well as the writers Luigi Pirandello and Ray Bradbury. Other guests included Pelé, Garry Kasparov, Bing Crosby, Alain Delon, and the virologist Albert Sabin. Armstrong sang from the balcony of his room during his 1957 visit, and de Gaulle slept in a bed built to order for his height.

== Gallery ==
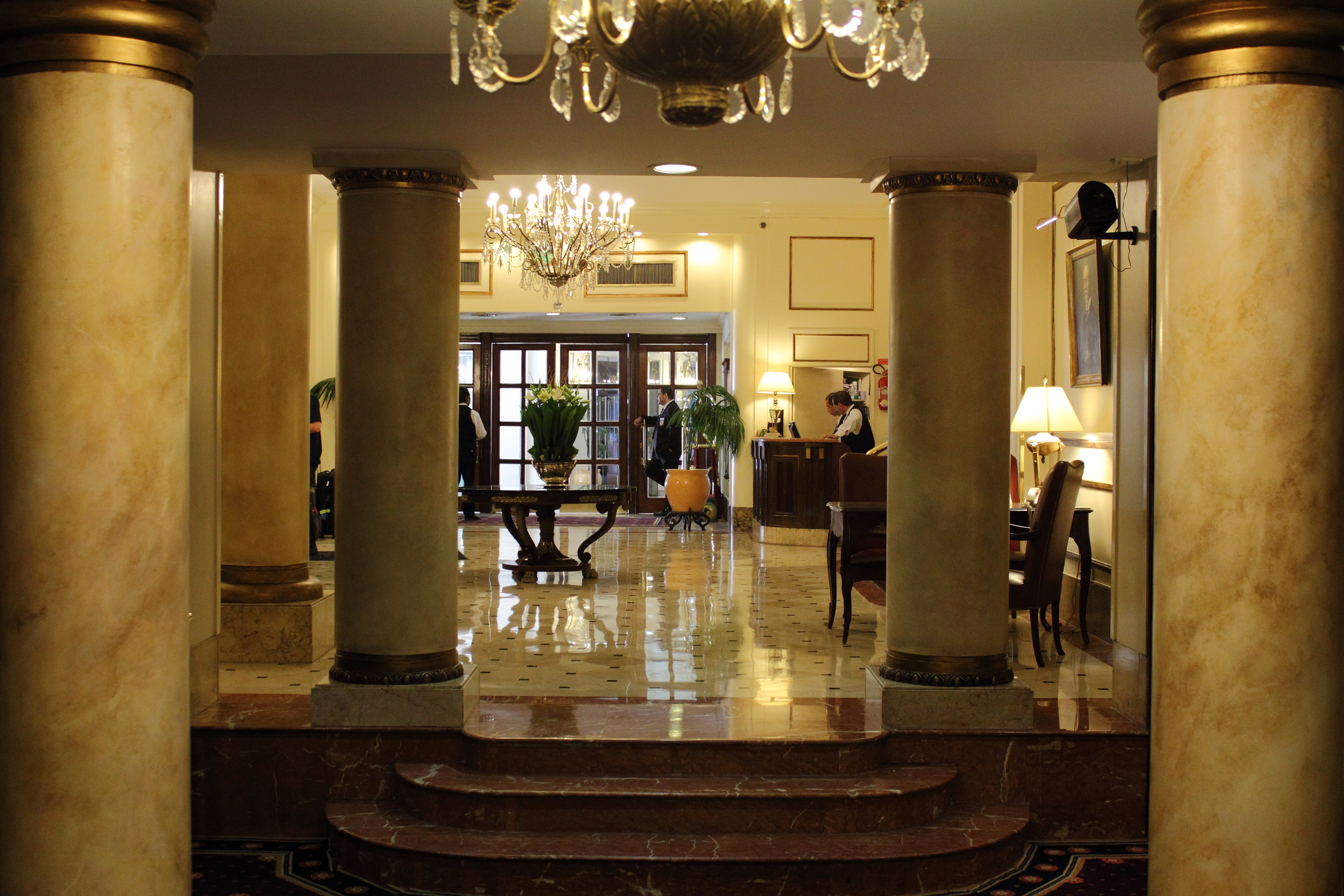
The lobby in 2013

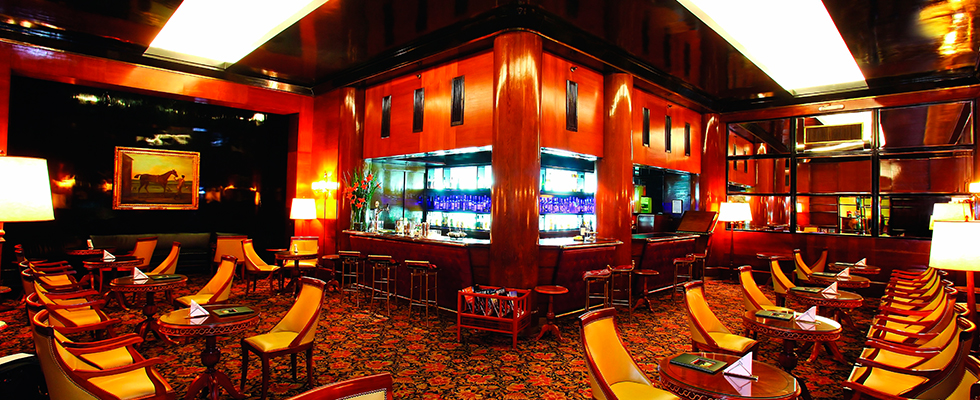
The hotel bar

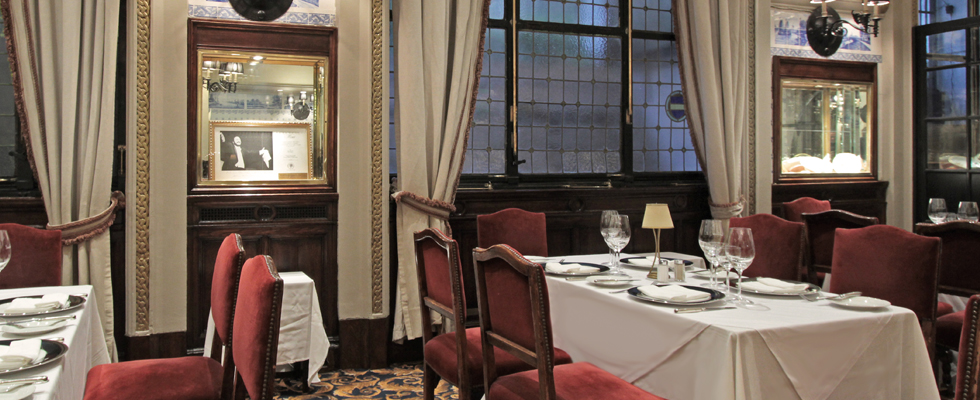
A dining room

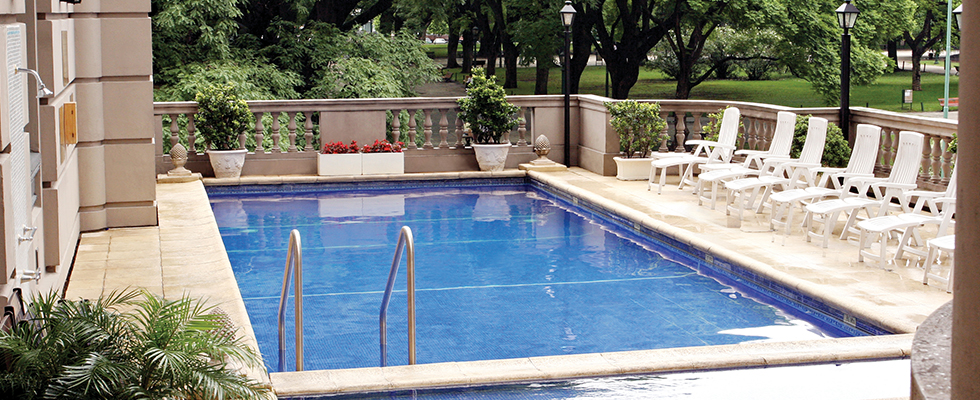
The outdoor pool

== See also ==
- Alvear Palace Hotel – Buenos Aires luxury hotel under the same ownership group
