= Administración de Parques Nacionales =

Federal agency of Argentina

National Parks Administration
- Administración de Parques Nacionales

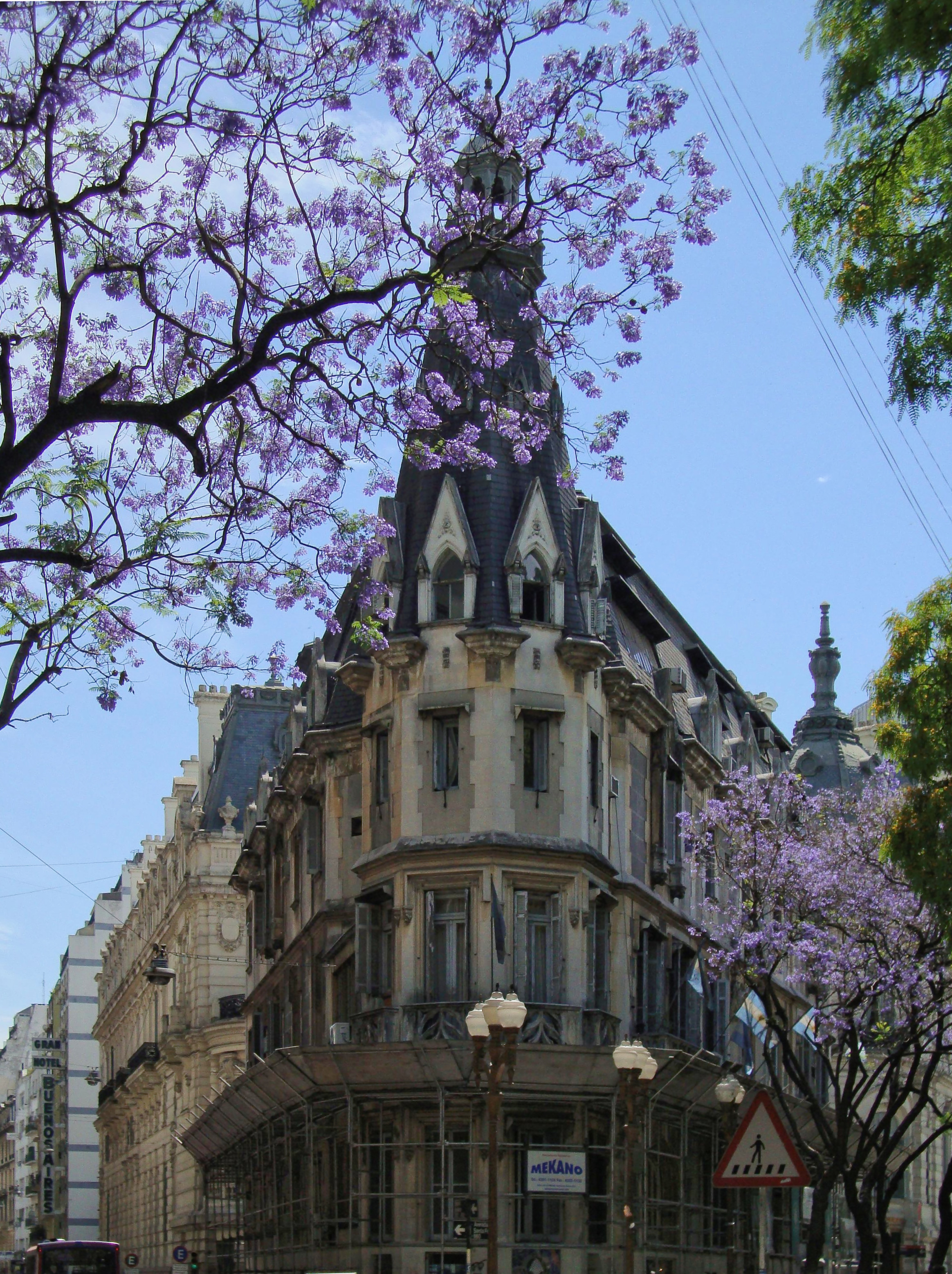
- Palacio Haedo, the Administration's main office

Agency overview
- Formed: September 30, 1934; 92 years ago
- Jurisdiction: Government of Argentina
- Headquarters: Buenos Aires
- Agency executive: Cristian Larsen, President
- Parent agency: Secretariat of the Interior
- Website: argentina.gob.ar/parquesnacionales

The National Parks Administration of Argentina (Spanish: Administración de Parques Nacionales) is a public agency in charge of maintaining the network of national parks, created in 1934 to preserve the biological diversity and the cultural resources of the country.

It is managed by the Secretariat of the Interior.

== History ==
The administration was established in 1934 by the federal law Nº 12 103/34 as the National Parks Department, together with creating Argentina's second national park, Iguazú. The first one, Del Sur, now known as Nahuel Huapi, preceded the department's creation by 12 years.
