= Carlos Thays =

French architect

Carlos (Charles) Thays
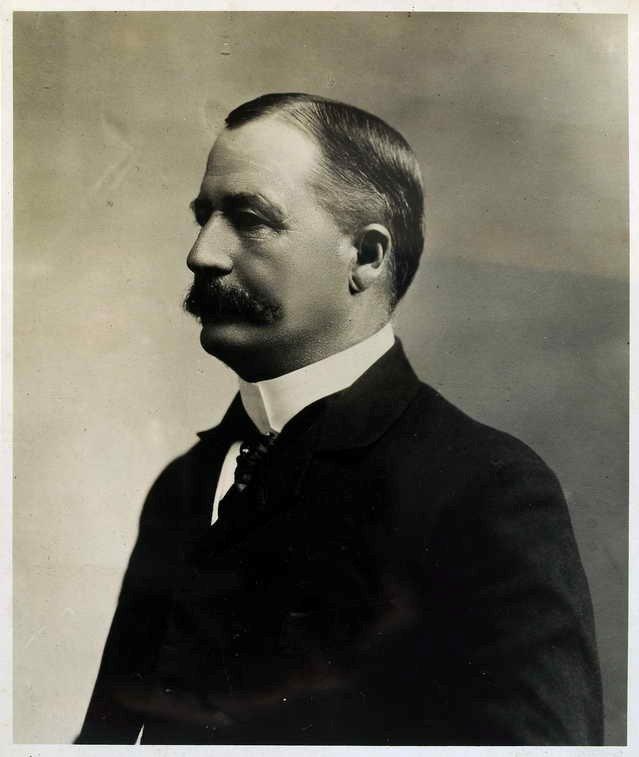
- Thays photo archive
- Born: August 20, 1849; Paris, France
- Died: January 31, 1934 (aged 84); Buenos Aires, Argentina

Carlos Thays (August 20, 1849 – January 31, 1934) was a French-Argentine landscape architect, and a student of French landscape architect Édouard André.

== Biography ==
Born Jules Charles Thays in Paris, France in 1849, Carlos Thays arrived in Argentina in 1889, after he was recommended by Jean Alphand to Argentine pioneer Miguel Crisol, who contracted Thays to design Sarmiento Park in Córdoba. During his time in Córdoba Thays became infatuated with the young country and decided to spend the rest of his life in Argentina. After moving to Buenos Aires he was named the city's Director of Parks & Walkways in 1891. This position gave him significant influence over the design of the city's open spaces, and his legacy is still strongly felt in the city's open spaces today.

Major projects included tree planting along streets, remodeling and designing public plazas and walkways as well as designing completely new parks and expanding older ones. Major parks and plazas that particularly show Thays influence on Buenos Aires include the parks Centenario, Lezama, Patricios, Barrancas de Belgrano and the plazas Constitución, Congreso, and Mayo. Thays' French heritage is reflected in many of his designs, in so far that Buenos Aires' parks and plazas are often compared to similar designs in Paris.

One of Thays' largest undertakings was the Parque Tres de Febrero, a sweeping area of open land covering several square kilometers filled with thousands of trees, flowers, many fountains, and monuments in the barrio of Palermo.

A pet project of his was the Buenos Aires Botanical Garden, for which he petitioned the city government to set aside land (almost 8 hectares), which he designed in sections to display plants organised by continent, with a large section devoted to the native plants of Argentina, which were ignored in garden-making at the time. The garden has the first Ginkgo biloba planted in Argentina. Completed in 1898, it bears his name, the Jardín Botánico Carlos Thays de la Ciudad Autónoma de Buenos Aires. One greenhouse, was first erected at the Paris Exposition of 1889 and brought in sections from France to be reassembled, one of five in the garden. A brick house in the English Gothic Revival style, in which he lived during the construction and planting of the garden, now houses the herbarium and a small botanical library.

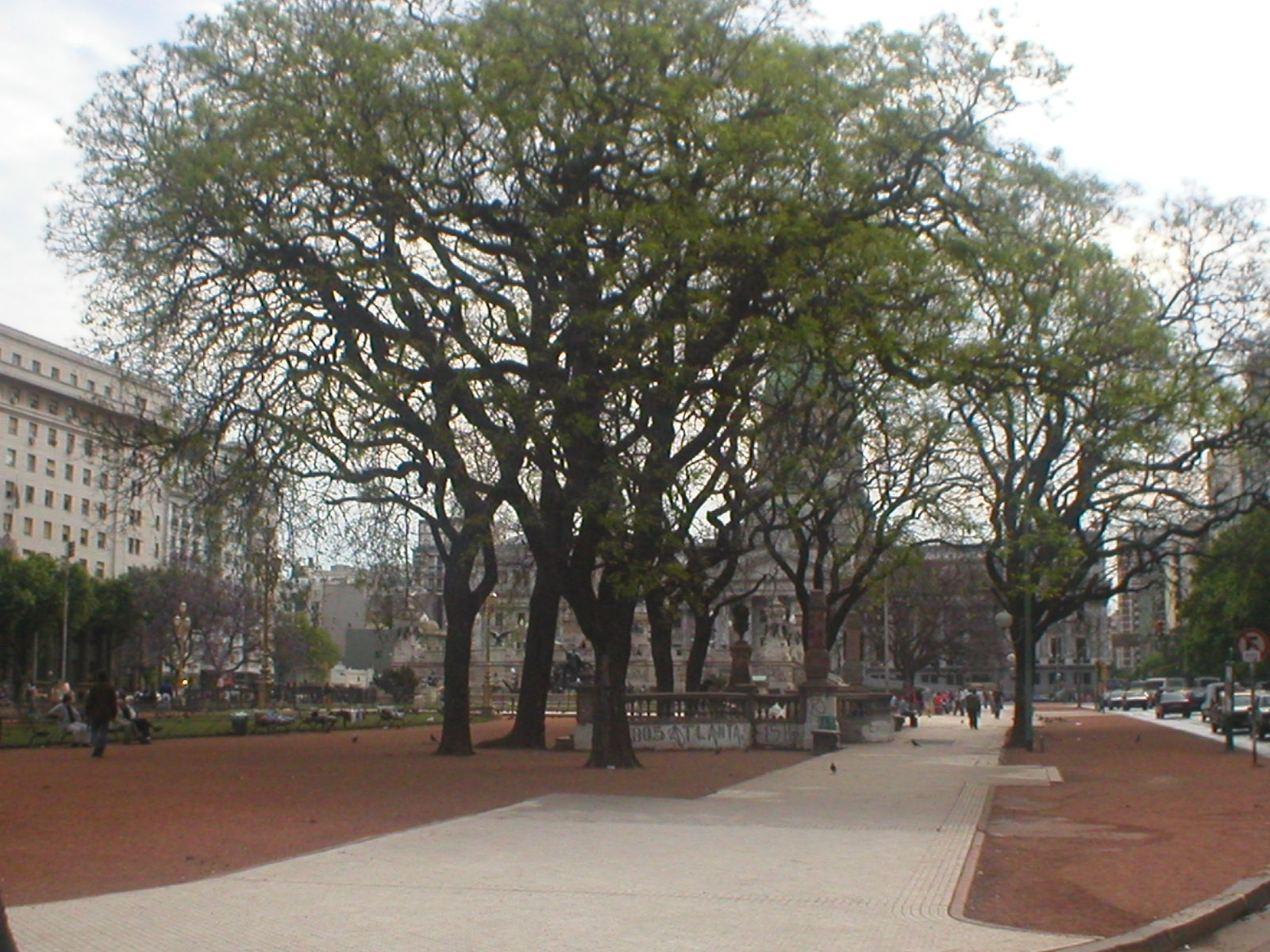
Plaza del Congreso, Buenos Aires

While Thays worked primarily in Buenos Aires throughout the years he also worked on many civic projects in other areas of Argentina, remodeling the Parque Sarmiento, Córdoba, designing the Parque Urquiza in Parana, Entre Rios, Parque 9 de Julio in San Miguel de Tucumán, the Parque de la Independencia in Rosario, and the Parque San Martin in Mendoza. Thays also designed the grounds of the luxurious Club Hotel de la Ventana, near Sierra de La Ventana in Buenos Aires Province. Work outside Argentina included the urban planning of the residential neighborhood of Carrasco, aid in the planning of the Parque Rodó, and the design of the Plaza Cagancha and Plaza Independencia in Montevideo, Uruguay.

Thays worked most extensively in Buenos Aires precisely at a period in the city's history where it was growing extremely fast as a result of immigration, especially from Spain and Italy. It is often noted that had Thays not insisted on high standards of design and frequent open spaces, many of the city's current open spaces would probably not exist.

Thays was also a central reference for the establishment of national parks in Argentina. In order to advance the integration of Misiones, the Gobernación del Territorio de Misiones and the Ministry of the Interior commissioned the re-nowned landscape architect and botanist Carlos Thays to travel to Iguazú and explore the tourist and environmental prospects there. In 1902 Thays recommended the establishment of a National Park around the Iguazú Falls. In order to define the use of the national park and to advance plan-ning, the expertise of Carlos Thays was again sought. And so, Thays made another trip to Iguazú that resulted in a detailed report, richly illustrated with photos, entitled "Parque Nacional de Iguazú", which the famous landscape architect presented to the Minister of Agriculture, Adolfo Mujica, in March 1912.

Alongside Francisco Moreno and other prominent figures, Thays founded the Boy Scouts Association of Argentina, on July 4, 1912.

Thays died in Buenos Aires in 1934.
