= Sierra de La Ventana (town) =

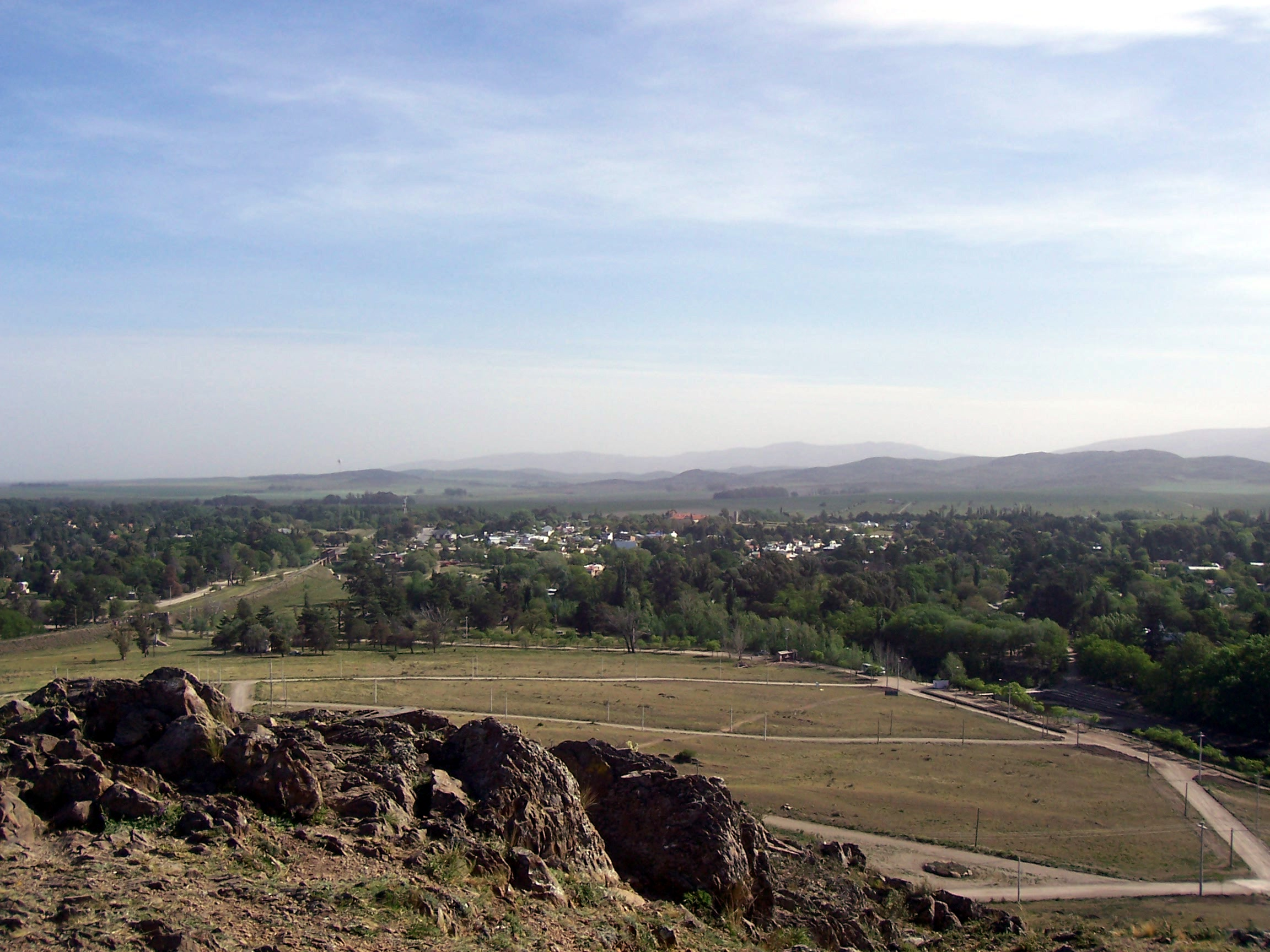
- Interactive map of Sierra de La Ventana
- Coordinates: 38°08′S 61°47′W
- Country: Argentina
- Province: Buenos Aires
- Partido: Tornquist
- Founded: 17 January 1908
- Elevation: 250 m (820 ft)

Population (2001 census [INDEC])
  - Total: 1,819
- CPA Base: B 8168
- Area code: +54 2915

Sierra de La Ventana is a village in Tornquist Partido in the southwest of the Province of Buenos Aires, Argentina. With a population of 1,819 inhabitants (2001 census [INDEC]), it is one of the most attractive tourist centres in the Province and has numerous recreation areas and parks.

The town, originally called Villa Tívoli Argentina, was founded on 17 January 1908 by Diedrich Meyer and developed around the railway station. It was later renamed Sierra de La Ventana after the nearby 1,186 m rocky peak La Ventana, part of the Sierra de la Ventana mountains, which has a natural rock formation containing an opening or 'window' 9 m wide and 11 m high. In 1959 the peak was declared a Natural Monument.

A large, luxurious hotel resort, Club Hotel de la Ventana, was opened in 1911 near Villa Ventana, 17 km from the town. For a brief period, it attracted the rich and famous but soon suffered from the effects of World War I in Europe and closed in 1920. Between 1940 and 1946 it was used to intern some of the crew of the German pocket battleship Admiral Graf Spee after it was scuttled outside the harbour of Montevideo, Uruguay, by its captain, Hans Langsdorff, at the end of the Battle of the River Plate.
