= Aimar Centeno =

Argentine footballer (born 1986)

Personal information
- Date of birth: 1986 (age 39–40)
- Place of birth: Agustín Roca, Junín, Buenos Aires, Argentina
- Positions: Midfielder; winger

Youth career
- Renato Cesarini
- 2003: River Plate
- 2004: Chacarita Juniors

Senior career*
Years	Team	Apps	(Gls)
2005	Sarmiento		
2005	→ Teodolina (loan)		
2006–2016	Origone		
- * Club domestic league appearances and goals

Aimar Centeno (born 1986) is an Argentine former footballer who played as a midfielder.

== Early life ==
Centeno was born in early 1986 in the town of Agustín Roca, within the county of Junín in Buenos Aires Province. He inherited his passion for football from his father, Roberto, who took him to play football in local fields at the age of three.

== Career ==
=== Early career and Camino a la Gloria ===
Centeno moved to Rosario without his family as a child, joining the Renato Cesarini footballing school. In early 2002, Centeno was one of over 12,000 young footballers between the ages of fourteen and seventeen to try out for Camino a la Gloria (Road to Glory), a show broadcast on Canal 13 looking for the next young Argentine footballing star, with the prize being a trial with Spanish side Real Madrid.

Having showcased his ability at the Campo Argentino de Polo, in front of hundreds of onlookers, he was selected as one of the forty-two players to train at the ground of Hindú Club. In front of former footballers Roberto Perfumo, José Basualdo, Carlos Mac Allister and referee Javier Castrilli, Centeno fought off competition from fifteen other finalists to win the competition. In a 2009 interview with Junín-based newspaper Diario Democracia, Centeno revealed that Perfumo had already jokingly told him to "get his passport ready" before the final of the show.

=== Trial with Real Madrid ===
On his arrival at the Madrid–Barajas Airport, ahead of his trial with Real Madrid, Centeno was met by a host of journalists and photographers, and was asked for autographs, akin to the treatment received by professional footballers. As well as the trial, his expenses were all paid for, and he received a car and cash as part of the prize for winning the competition. He travelled with former Brazilian international footballer Delém, who had worked as a players' advisor on Camino a la Gloria, as well as his father.

Training with the club's 'Juvenil C' team, Centeno was injured in his first training session, suffering a tear to one of his abductor muscles. He spent two weeks training with Real Madrid's other injured players, before featuring in a game against a local Madrid-based side, where he played in the number 8 shirt. However, after another week of training, he was told that the trial had been unsuccessful.

=== Return to Argentina ===
On his return to Argentina, he went on trial with professional side River Plate, as part of an agreement with his former club Renato Cesarini. He was accepted into River Plate's academy, where his teammates included future Argentina and Colombia internationals, Augusto Fernández and Radamel Falcao, respectively. In his first six months with the club, he was the youth team's starting right-midfielder, but he was side-lined following another injury. Having struggled to integrate into the youth team, a trip to England was set to improve his relationships with his teammates. However, after being told by a coach that he was no longer going to be one of the travelling players, his performance levels dropped, and he would later state in the 2009 interview with Diario Democracia that he stopped caring, and that he made the mistake of "wasting" the last six months with River Plate.

Following his release, he trialled unsuccessfully with Rosario Central, before joining Chacarita Juniors. He only spent one year with Chacarita before joining Sarmiento, who were competing in the Primera B Nacional at the time. In his one season with Sarmiento, he was loaned to Primera B Metropolitana side Teodolina. He spent ten years with amateur Liga de Junín side Origone, winning the Torneo Interligas de Fútbol in 2010, before retiring from football in 2016.

== Later life ==
While playing for Sarmiento, Centeno worked as a concierge in a local hotel, before going on to work as a janitor, a soda delivery man, in a drugstore and as a truck driver.

== Impact on football ==
Centeno continues to be cited as an archetype of young South American footballers who return to the continent following failed moves to larger European clubs.
