= Maiztegui =

Maiztegui is a surname. Notable people with the surname include:

- Isidro B. Maiztegui (1905–1996), Argentine composer
- Jon Santacana Maiztegui (born 1980), Spanish alpine skier
- Julio Isidro Maiztegui (1931–1993), Argentine physician and epidemiologist
- Laura Maiztegui (born 1978), Argentine field hockey player

== See also ==
- 6307 Maiztegui, a main-belt asteroid
