= Santiago Fernández =

Santiago Fernandez may refer to:

- Santiago Fernández Barriga (1775–1847), Chilean military officer and politician
- Santiago Fernández (rower) (born 1976), Argentine rower
- Santiago Fernández (rugby union) (born 1985), Argentine rugby player
- Santiago Fernández (footballer, born 1985), Mexican football forward
- Santiago Fernández (footballer, born 1988), Argentine football midfielder
- Santiago Fernández (footballer, born 1991), Uruguayan football goalkeeper for CA Ituzaingó
- Santiago Fernández (footballer, born 2005), Argentine football defender for Talleres
