= National University of Northwestern Buenos Aires =

Coordinates: 34°35′07″S 60°57′00″W

- Universidad Nacional del Noroeste de la Provincia de Buenos Aires
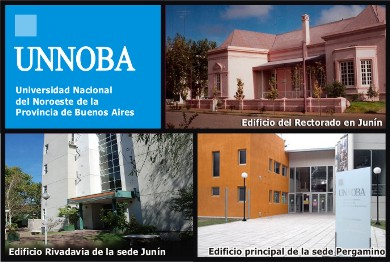
- Motto: Ciencia y educación para el desarollo social y el crecimiento regional
- Motto in English: Science and education for social development and regional growth
- Type: Public
- Established: 2002
- Rector: Guillermo Tamarit
- Administrative staff: 323
- Students: 6,500 (2009)
- Location: Junín, Argentina
- Campus: Junín and Pergamino
- Website: UNNOBA

The National University of Northwestern Buenos Aires (Universidad Nacional del Noroeste de la Provincia de Buenos Aires or UNNOBA hereafter) is a national university with head office and campus in Junín, Argentina. This city concentrates 80% of the activities, and nearly 2 out of 3 students take classes there. The university has also a campus in Pergamino city.

The UNNOBA was created on December 16, 2002, as the composition between the Junín Regional University Center (CURJ), started in 1990, which reached 15,000 students, and the Pergamino Regional University Center (CRUP), established a year later, which had 2,600 students.

The University may establish more branches in other locations of the influence area which covers the northwest of the province of Buenos Aires, southern Santa Fe and Córdoba and northeast of La Pampa.

The university and the municipality of Junín, are the mainstays of the Buenos Aires Northwestern Technological Center (Polo Tecnológico del Noroeste Bonaerense) and the Regional Research Laboratory in Biofuels, both projects located in Junin. On the other hand, the Pergamino Biotechnology Center the School of Agricultural, Environmental and Natural Sciences (ECANA in Spanish) are being developed in Pergamino. It also has agreements with the National Agricultural Technology Institute (INTA) and the Maiztegui National Human Viral Disease Institute (INEVH) of Pergamino.

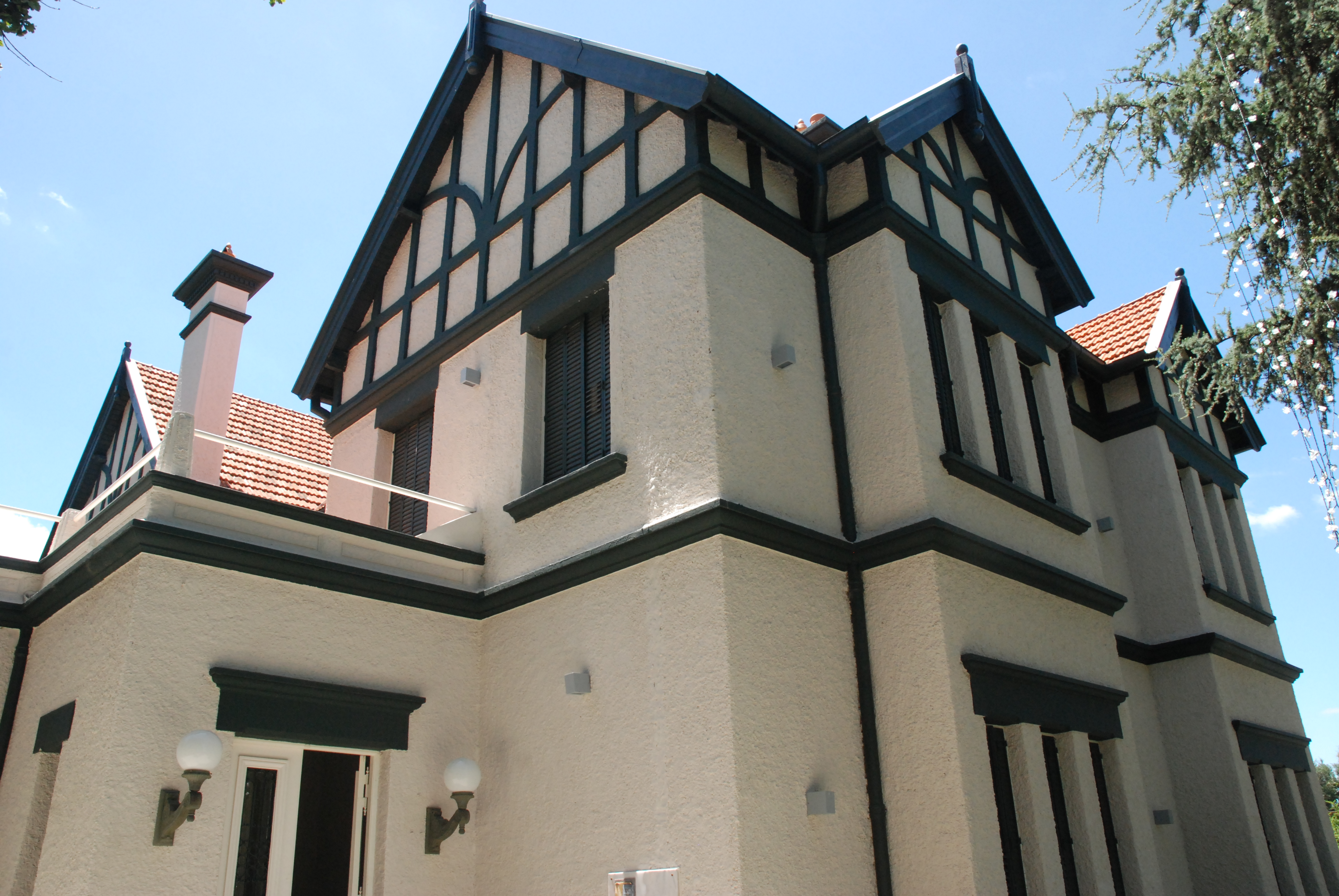
Reforma Universitaria Building, University Rector headquarters.

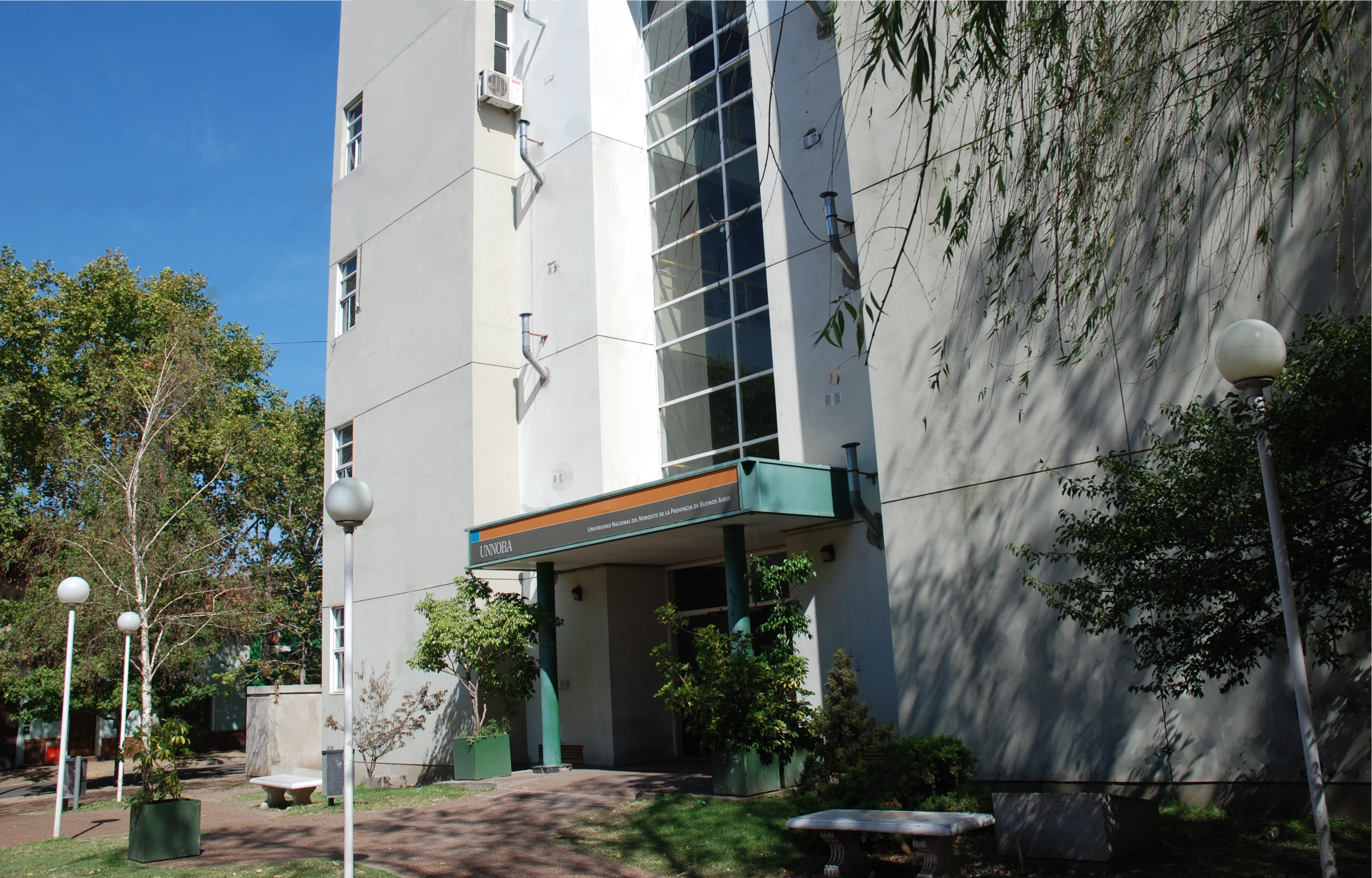
Rivadavia Building.

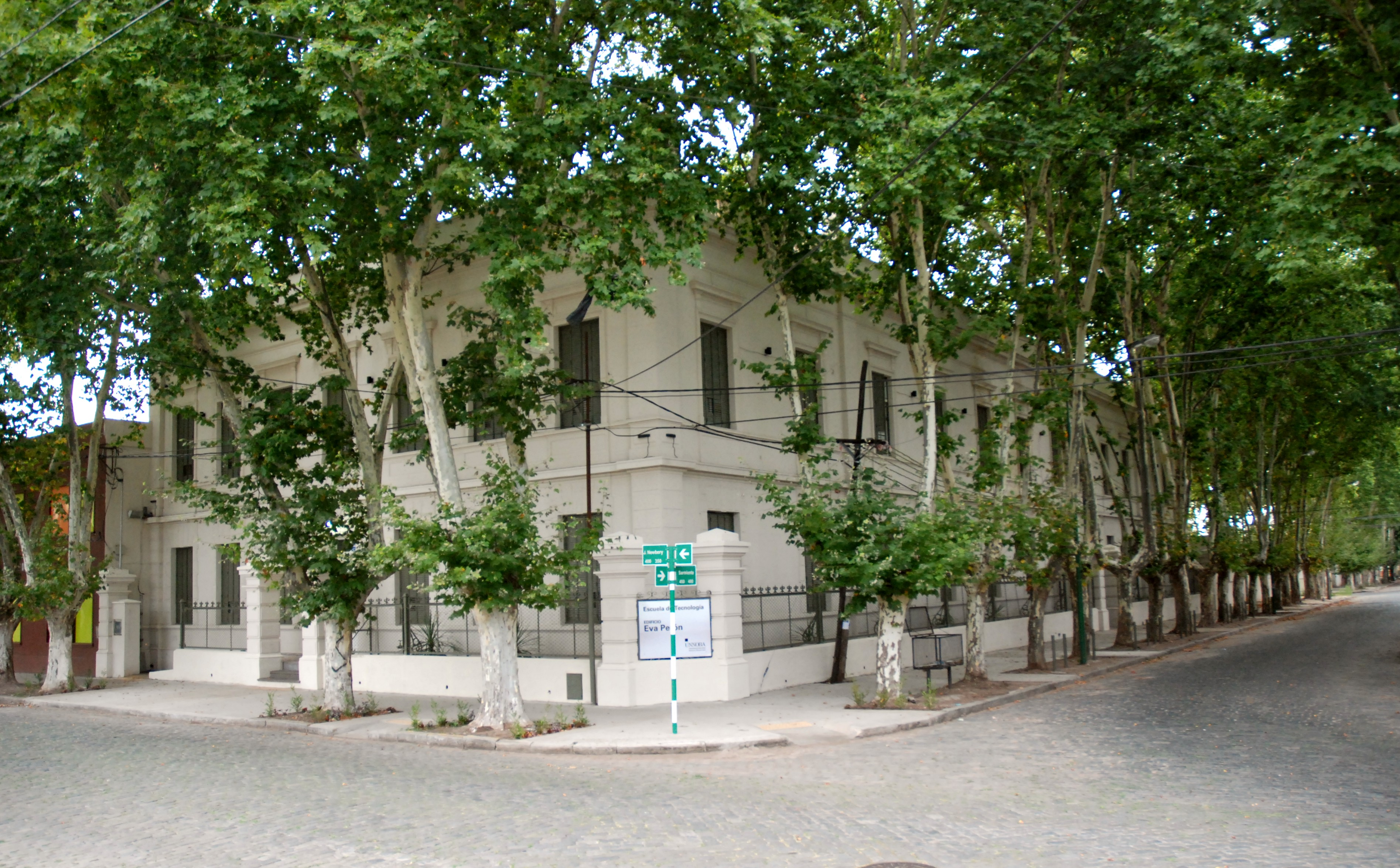
Eva Perón Building.

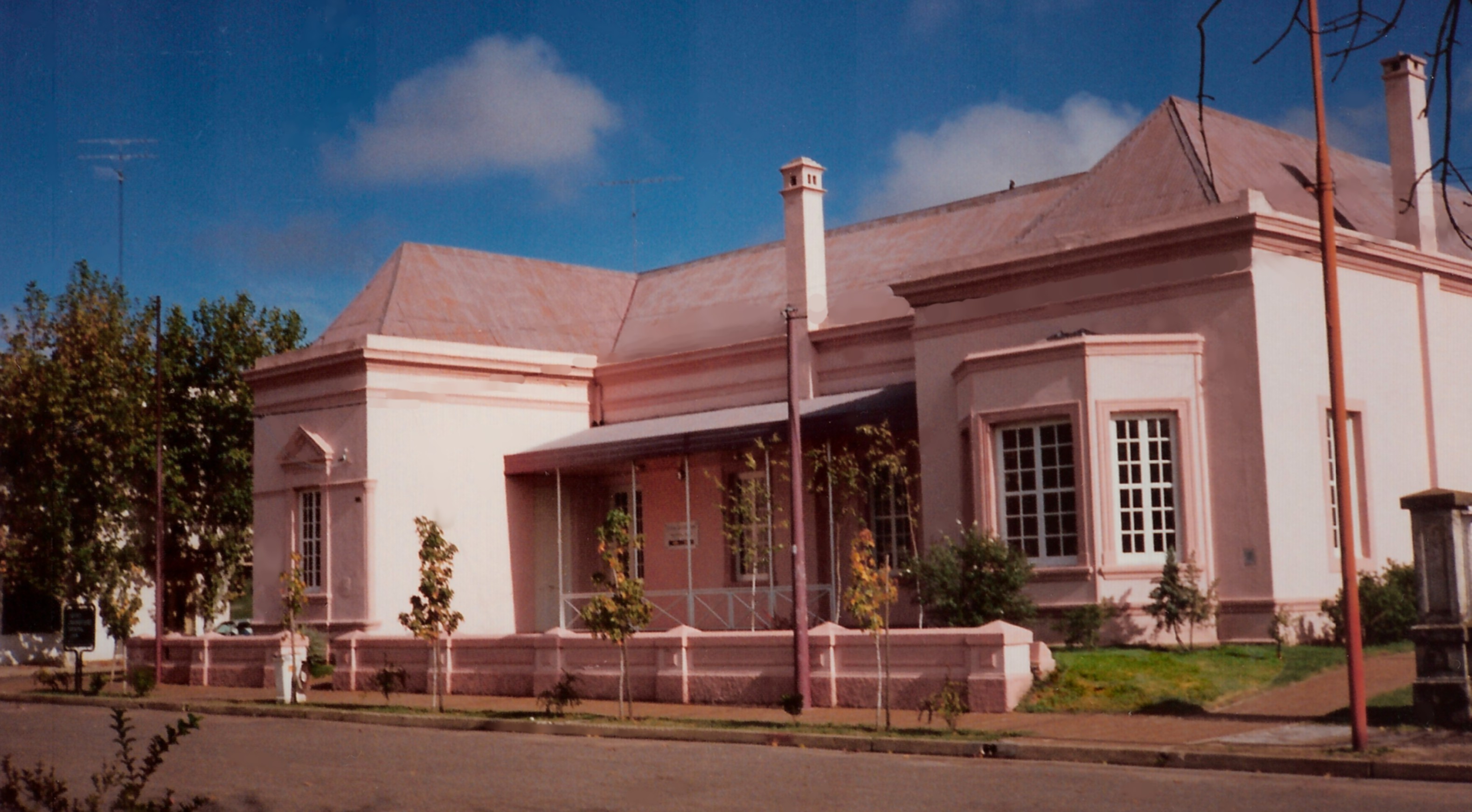
Sáenz Peña Building.

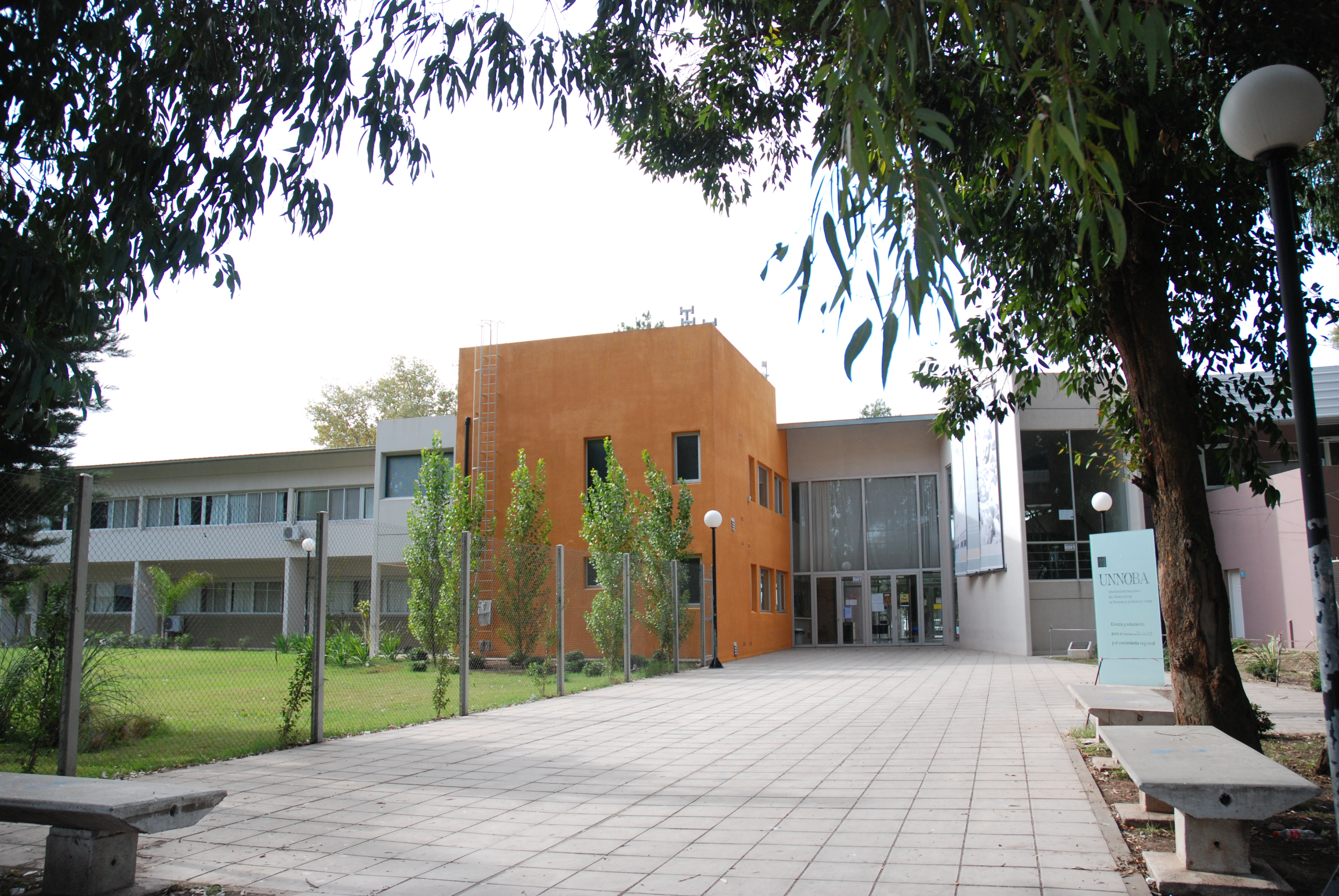
Pergamino Campus.
