= Susana Dillon =

Susana Dillon (1925–2012) was an Argentine writer. She was born in Pergamino to a family of French origin. She settled down in Río Cuarto in 1963. Her pregnant daughter disappeared by the Argentine military junta in the Dirty War, and subsequently she became an active member of the Madres de Plaza de Mayo.

She raised her granddaughter, the musician and filmmaker Pepi Dillon.
