= Carlos Barbarito =

Argentine poet

Carlos Barbarito is an Argentine poet born in Pergamino, Buenos Aires, Argentina on 6 February 1955.

== Books ==
Barbarito has written several books, such as:

- Poesía quebrada (1984)
- Teatro de lirios (1985)
- Éxodos y trenes (1987)
- Páginas del poeta flaco (1988)
- Caballos y otros poemas (1990)
- Viga bajo el agua (1992)
- Meninas. Desnudo y la máscara (1992)
- Bestiario de amor (1992)
- El peso de los días (1995)
- La luz y alguna cosa (1998)
- Desnuda materia (1999)
- Roberto Aizenberg. Diálogos con Carlos Barbarito (2001)
- Puntos de fuga (2002)
- La orilla desierta (2003)
- Piedra encerrada en piedra (2004)
- Figuras de ojo y sombras (2006)
- Un fuego bajo un cielo que huye (2009)
- Cenizas del mediodía (2010)
- Paracelso (2014)
- Falla en el instante puro (2016)
- Radiación de fondo (2018)
- Materia desnuda (2020)
- Norma Bessouet (2020)
- Lugar de apariciones (2021)
- Aberastury. Obras/Works (2022)

== Prizes ==
- Prize Francisco López Merino.
- Prize Foundation Alejandro González Gattone.
- Prize Concurso Régimen de Fomento a la Producción Literaria Nacional y Estímulo a la Industrial *Editorial, Fondo Nacional de las Artes.
- Prize Bienal de Crítica de Arte Jorge Feinsilber.
- Prize Tierras Planas.
- Prize Fundación Argentina para la Poesía.
- Gran Premio Libertad.
- Prize Raúl Gustavo Aguirre of the Sociedad Argentina de Escritores.
- Prize César Tiempo.
- Mention Concurso Revista Plural, México.
- Third Prize Fundación INCA.
- Mention of Honour Leopoldo Marechal y Carlos Allberto Débole.
- Third Prize Enrique Pezzoni of the Centro de Estudiantes de Filosofía y Letras of the University of Buenos Aires.
- Prize Iparragirre Saria.

== Translations ==
Many of the poems of Carlos Barbarito have been translated: in English (by Adriana Uturbey, David Hughes, Brian Cole, Héctor Ranea, Stefan Beyst, Jonah Gabry and Ricardo Nirenberg), in French (by Chantal Enright, Jean Dif, Frie Flammend and Elina Kohen), in Portuguese (by Andréa Santos, Andréa Ponte, Ana María Rodriguez González, Rudolph Link and Alberto Augusto Miranda), in Italian (by D.Gg. Dellisola) and in Dutch (by Stefan Beyst).

For translations in English, see:

- Carlos Barbarito: poems
