= Agustín Roca =

- Town
- Location within Buenos Aires Province
- Coordinates: 34°30′S 60°51′W
- Country: Argentina
- Province: Buenos Aires
- Partidos: Junín
- Established: July 7, 1888
- Elevation: 73 m (240 ft)

Population (2001 Census)
  - Total: 955
- Time zone: UTC−3 (ART)
- CPA Base: B 6001
- Climate: Dfc

Agustín Roca is a town located in the Junín Partido in the province of Buenos Aires, Argentina. The town consists of 42 blocks.

== Geography ==
Agustín Roca is located 14 km (8.7 mi) from the town of Junín, and 275 km (171 mi) from the city of Buenos Aires.

== History ==
Agustín Roca was founded on July 7, 1888. The land making up the town initially belonged to two brothers who bought the land in 1879. A railway station had previously been built in what would become the town in 1884. The town was settled by large numbers of immigrants from Piedmont, in Italy.

== Population ==
According to INDEC, which collects population data for the country, the town had a population of 955 people as of the 2001 census.

== Notable people ==
Folk singer Atahualpa Yupanqui spent part of his childhood in the town.
