= Santiago Fernández (footballer, born 1988) =

Argentine footballer (born 1988)

Personal information
- Full name: Santiago Nicolás Fernández
- Date of birth: 3 March 1988 (age 38)
- Place of birth: Olivos, Buenos Aires, Argentina
- Height: 1.73 m (5 ft 8 in)
- Position: Midfielder

Youth career
- 12 de Octubre
- Novena de Excursio
- 2003: Excursionistas
- 2003–2008: Ferro Carril Oeste

Senior career*
Years	Team	Apps	(Gls)
2008–2011	Ferro Carril Oeste	66	(5)
2012	Olaria	4	(0)
2012	Tiro Federal	2	(0)
2013–2014	Agropecuario	0	(0)
2013–2014	→ Chacarita Juniors (loan)	16	(0)
2015	Juventud Unida	13	(0)
2016–2017	Unión Aconquija	14	(0)
2018	Racing de Colon	0	(0)
Total		115	(5)
- * Club domestic league appearances and goals

Santiago Nicolás Fernández (born 3 March 1988) is an Argentine former footballer who played as a midfielder.

== Career ==
=== Early career ===
Born in Olivos, in the Buenos Aires Province, Fernández began his career with local sides 12 de Octubre and Novena de Excursio.

=== Camino a la Gloria ===
Fernández decided to try out for Camino a la Gloria (Road to Glory), a show broadcast in 2002 on Canal 13 looking for the next young Argentine footballing star, with the prize being a trial with Spanish side Real Madrid. He was one of over 12,000 young footballers between the ages of fourteen and seventeen to try out, and was notably almost removed from the competition by his mother, as she was upset that, if he won, he would move away from home. After player advisor, and former Brazilian international footballer, Delém was able to convince her to let him compete, he eventually finished second to Aimar Centeno.

=== Professional career ===
Fernández states that he was told trials with Boca Juniors and River Plate would follow the show, but these did not materialise, and he instead went on to join Excursionistas. He later received a call from agent, and then-manager of Ferro Carril Oeste, Gustavo Mascardi, who invited him to trial with the Caballito-based club. He joined the club and progressed through the academy, going on to make his debut in March 2008 and spending three-and-a-half years, accumulating sixty-six appearances and scoring five goals.

After spending a half a year in Brazil with Olaria, he moved back to Argentina, joining Torneo Argentino B side Tiro Federal. He returned to professional football in 2013, joining Chacarita Juniors on a season-long loan deal from Agropecuario, but would have to undergo surgery for a hernia in September of the same year. Ahead of the 2015 season, Fernández signed with Juventud Unida, and this would prove to be his last professional club; spells with Unión Aconquija and Racing de Colon followed before he retired in 2018 following an injury.
