= Junín Airport =

Airport in Argentina

Junín Airport Aeropuerto de Junín
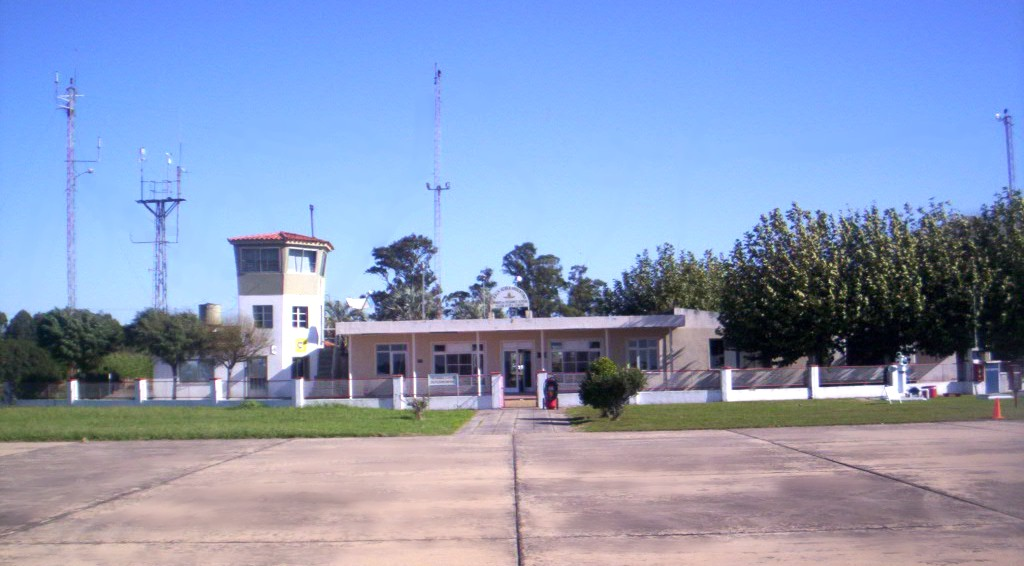
- IATA: JNI; ICAO: SAAJ

Summary
- Airport type: Closed
- Serves: Junín, Argentina
- Elevation AMSL: 262 ft / 80 m
- Coordinates: 34°32′45″S 60°55′50″W

Map
- Location of the airport in Argentina

Runways
| Direction | Length | | Surface |
| Direction | ft | m | Surface |
|---|---|---|---|
Closed
- Sources: ORSNA, WAD Google Maps

Junín Airport (Spanish: Aeropuerto de Junín) (IATA: JNI, ICAO: SAAJ) was a domestic airport serving Junín, a city in the Buenos Aires Province of Argentina. It is located 2 kilometres (1 mi) north of the city.

Current aerial imagery shows the runway is marked closed. Google Earth Historical Imagery (8/31/2009), (9/9/2013) show the closure was sometime after August 2009.

The Junin VOR and non-directional beacon (Idents: NIN) are located on the field.

== Historical facts ==
World gliding championship in 1963: http://www.volaravela.com.ar/mundial.htm?i=1

== Accidents and incidents ==
- 17 May 1948: A FAMA Viking 615, tail number LV-AFL, crashed on landing at the airport while performing a test flight, catching fire. There were no reported fatalities but the aircraft was written off.

== See also ==
- Transport in Argentina
- List of airports in Argentina
