= Julio Isidro Maiztegui =

Argentine physician and epidemiologist

Julio Isidro Maiztegui (August 25, 1931 – August 29, 1993) was an Argentine physician and epidemiologist.

== Life and work ==
Maiztegui was born in Bahía Blanca, Argentina, in 1931. He received a medical degree from the University of Buenos Aires, in 1957, and the following year, began his residency at the Boston University Hospital. He specialized in the treatment of infectious disease and in 1964, received a master's degree in Public Health at Harvard. He entered the Clinical Research and Medical Education Center (CEMIC) in Buenos Aires (Argentina) in 1965 and went on to receive a Master of Epidemiology from the University of London, in 1969.

Returning to Argentina, he began research on Argentine hemorrhagic fever, a condition known among the country's rural population as the mal de los rastrojos ("the sickness of the corn straw"). Transmitted mainly by mice dwelling in fallow corn fields, the disease was believed to affect up to 1,000 people annually and was concentrated in the pampas. First reported in 1958, the fever claimed up to a 30% mortality rate in its early years.

Maiztegui's research led to a breakthrough in the treatment of the disease: in 1971, he devised the introduction of blood plasma from recovered patients in saline solution to those whose exposure had taken place under eight days earlier. The treatment, which reduced mortality rates from 30% to around 1% of those infected, led to greater support for the work at CEMIC, and in 1978, the National Institute of Hemorrhagic Viruses (INVH) was established in Pergamino with Dr. Maiztegui as its director.

A former colleague of Maiztegui's, Dr. Julio Barrera Oro, developed the Candid#1 vaccine at the U.S. Army Research Laboratory, in 1985, and the vaccine became available locally in 1990. Dr. Maiztegui remained at the helm of the INVH until his death from heart failure in 1993, at age 62. The INVH was renamed in his honor in 1994 and the Julio Maiztegui Scientific Foundation was established in 1995.

== Legacy ==
Dr Maiztegui's legacy continued, and his ideas continue to be investigated in the s. XXI for the cure of other diseases such as that caused by hantavirus and COVID-19.
