= Junín Partido =

Junín Partido de Junín
- Department
- location of Junín Partido in Buenos Aires Province
- Coordinates: 34°35′S 60°57′W
- Country: Argentina
- Established: October 12, 1881
- Founder: provincial law
- Seat: Junín

Government
  - Intendant: Juan Carlos Fiorini (PRO)

Area
  - Total: 2,263 km^{2} (874 sq mi)

Population
  - Total: 88,664
  - Density: 39.18/km^{2} (101.5/sq mi)
- Demonym: juninense
- Postal Code: B6000
- IFAM: BUE063
- Area Code: 02362
- Website: www.junin.gov.ar

Junín Partido is a county (partido) in the province of Buenos Aires, Argentina. Its population is 88,664 inhabitants (2001 census [INDEC]) and the population density reaches 39.4 inhabitants/km^{2}. Its administrative seat is the city of Junín.

== Geography ==
Junín occupies an area of 2,263 km^{2} (874 sq mi),

It is bounded on the northwest by General Arenales, on the northeast by Rojas, on the east by Chacabuco, on the southeast by Bragado, on the south by General Viamonte, on the southwest by Lincoln and on the west by Leandro N. Alem.

== Settlements ==
- Junín
- Agustina
- Blandengues
- Balneario Laguna de Gómez (AKA: Laguna de Gómez)
- Agustín Roca (AKA: Coronel Marcos Paz)
- Fortín Tiburcio
- La Agraria
- La Oriental
- Laplacette
- Las Parvas
- Morse
- Saforcada

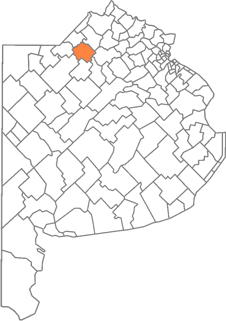
Location of the Municipality of Junín in the Buenos Aires province.
