= Maiztegui National Human Viral Disease Institute =

Research institute in Argentina

The Maiztegui National Human Viral Disease Institute is a viral research laboratory in Pergamino, Argentina.

== Overview ==
The Maiztegui National Human Viral Disease Institute originated in the Clinical Research and Medical Education Center in Pergamino. The city, a prosperous agricultural hub in the heart of Argentina's corn belt, was also the epicenter in 1958 of a sudden outbreak of Argentine hemorrhagic fever, a condition known among the country's rural population as the mal de los rastrojos ("the sickness of the corn straw"). Transmitted mainly by mice dwelling in fallow corn fields, the disease was believed to affect up to 1,000 people annually and claimed up to a 30% mortality rate in its early years.

One of its researchers, Dr. Julio Isidro Maiztegui, developed breakthrough in the treatment of the disease in 1971 when he devised the introduction of blood plasma from recovered patients in saline solution to those whose exposure had taken place under eight days earlier. The treatment, which reduced mortality rates from 30% to around 1% of those infected, led to greater support for the work at the education center, and in 1978, the National Institute of Hemorrhagic Viruses was established in Pergamino, with Dr. Maiztegui as its director.

Work began on a new building in 1980 to replace the institute's outdated facilities and in 1985, the first wing was inaugurated. Dr. Maiztegui remained at the helm of the National Institute of Hemorrhagic Viruses until his death from heart failure in 1993, at age 62, and the institute was renamed in his memory in 1994.

The Maiztegui National Human Viral Disease Institute has performed research for the World Health Organization since 1985 and currently specializes in four areas:

- Arenaviruses
- Arboviruses
- Hantavirus
- Production of biological specimens
