= Junín, Buenos Aires =

City in Buenos Aires Province, Argentina

Junín
- City
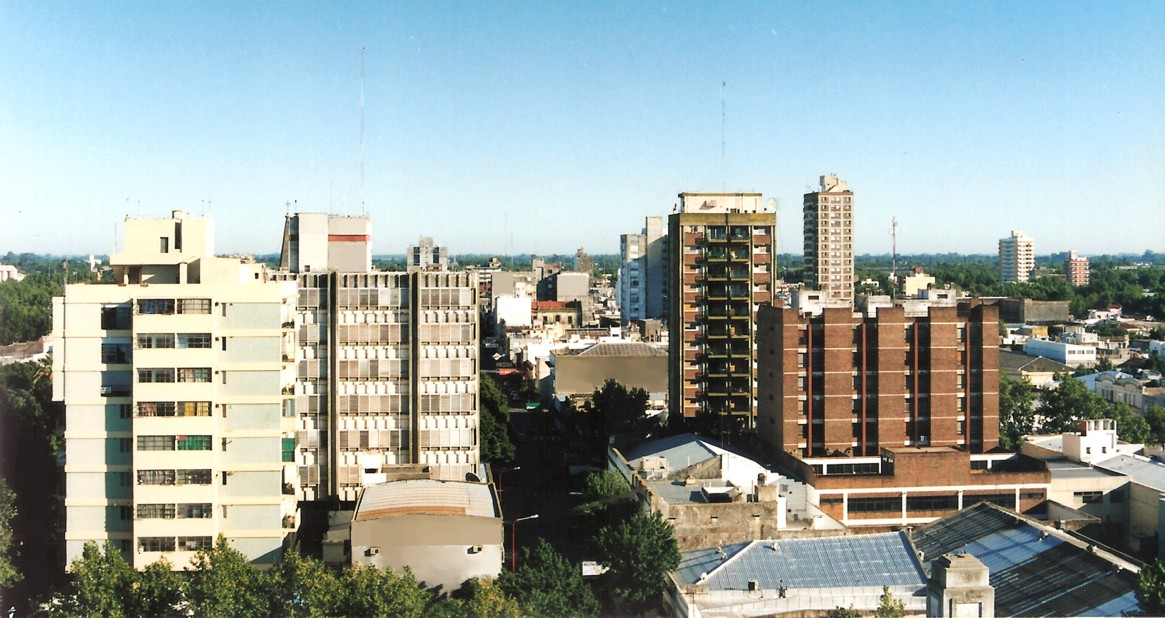
- Downtown Junín

- Location within Buenos Aires Province Location within Argentina
- Coordinates: 34°35′S 60°57′W
- Country: Argentina
- Province: Buenos Aires
- Partido: Junín
- Founded: December 27, 1827
- Elevation: 81 m (266 ft)

Population (2010 census [INDEC])
  - Total: 85,420
  - Density: 3,434/km^{2} (8,890/sq mi)
- CPA Base: B 6000
- Area code: +54 236
- Patron saint: Saint Ignatius of Loyola
- Website: Official website

Junín (IPA: [xuˈnin]) is a city in the province of Buenos Aires, Argentina, and administrative seat of the partido of Junín. It has a population of 85,420 (2010 census [INDEC]) and is located 260 km (162 mi) west of the city of Buenos Aires.

== History ==
Inhabited by the native Charrúa people, the area's strategic location on the Salado River made it of interest to Spanish Viceroy Juan José de Vértiz y Salcedo, who established an outpost there in the 1790s as part of a line of defense against raids by displaced natives. The location became known as El Potroso.

El Potroso was restrengthened by a fort by way of an 1826 decree by President Bernardino Rivadavia, and on December 27, 1827, the citadel was established under the command of a veteran of the Argentine War of Independence, Bernardino Escribano, as Fuerte de la Federación. The advent of Buenos Aires Province Governor Juan Manuel de Rosas led to Escribano's 1829 destitution as commander; though the intervention of an officer, Isidoro Suárez, forestalled a bloodbath. Suárez, a veteran of one of the last battles of the War for Independence (the Battle of Junín, in Peru), inadvertently gave the failing settlement its new name by his deeds: "Junín."

Political wrangling and ongoing Indian raids had all but torn Junín down by the 1830s, however, and this prompted Governor Rosas to send the remaining settlers provisions and to subsidize crop farming in the neighbouring, high-yielding pampas fields. This was followed by a pact with Ranquel Chief Santiago Yanquelén, whereby his folks would defend Junín against raids by other tribes. Towards the end of his rule, Rosas appointed José Seguí, among the few Afro Argentines to achieve a commissioned officer's rank, to administer Junín, in 1851. Seguí was an efficient, though repressive commander, and in 1863, he was killed at his nearby ranch.

Rosas' 1852 overthrow resulted in the appointment of a justice of the peace, who firstly shared governing duties with the military commander. Junín's first general store (Basterreix) opened in 1860, and in 1861, Junín elected its first city council (despite being officially only a fort). The province designated the area as a county in 1864, and with nearly 2,000 inhabitants, Junín stops to be categorized as a "fort," and its first municipal master plan was laid out in 1865.

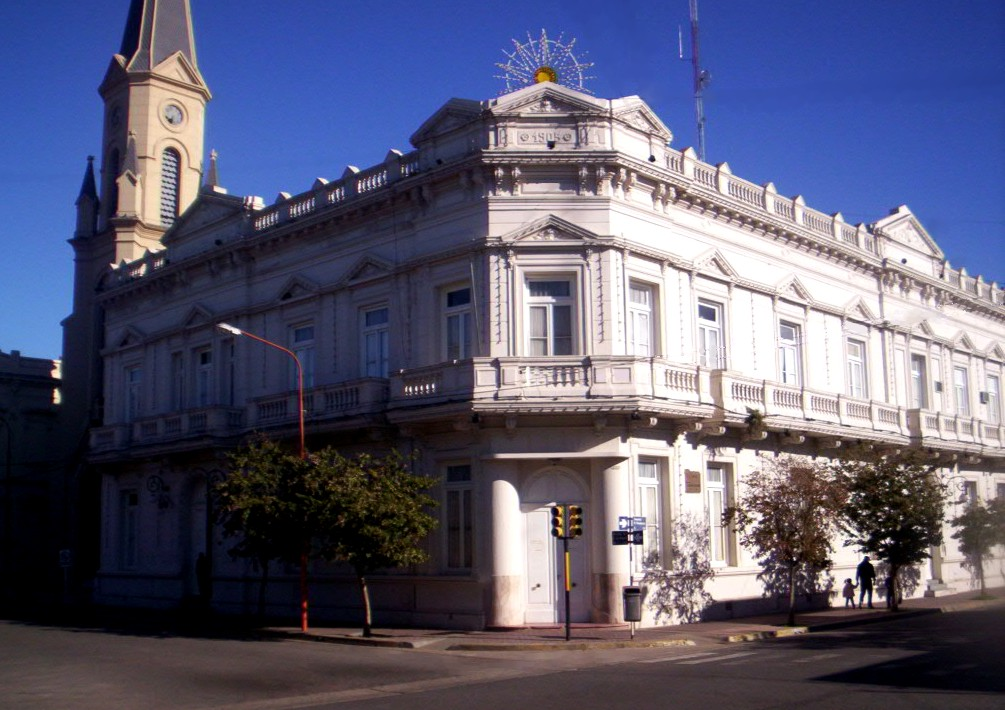
City Hall

The 1880 arrival of the Central Argentine Railway and that of the Buenos Aires and Pacific Railway (B.A.& P.) in 1884 led to the town's fast growth. The National Bank of Argentina had opened a branch there in 1892 and by the 1895 census, Junín was home to over 12,000. The town's largest employer by then was the B.A.& P.'s rail-equipment factory, with over 1,600 workers. The City Hall was completed in 1904, and Junín was named a "city" in 1906.

Junín's steady development over the following decades and setting amid lakes made it a well-known regional tourist destination. A hunting club was established in 1938, and a fishermen's pier and club on Lake El Carpincho, in 1942. The Aero Club Junín (1940) became well-known following the IX International Gliding Competition in 1963, and the nearby Borchex Municipal Park and Lake Gómez both have become popular weekend destinations since the 1960s; Lake Gómez attracted around 350,000 visitors during the 2006-07 summer season. Nearby Estancia La Oriental has attracted growing rural tourism to the area, as well.

The city is home to an important Municipal Historical Museum, maybe best known for its paleontology hall and its woolly mammoth fossils, and the Ángel María de Rosa Municipal Museum of Art (1944). In a bid to further diversify the city's economy, an industrial park was authorized north of the city in 1995, and a racetrack, the Autódromo Eusebio Marcilla, was opened in 2003. The closure of much of Argentina's passenger-rail service during the 1990s was partly offset in Junín by the buying of local rail facilities by América Latina Logística, a São Paulo-based rail transport provider operating largely in Argentina, as well as by establishment of the Junín Railworks Cooperative.

The city features numerous cinemas, as well as prominent stage theatres such as the Teatro de la Ranchería (1971). The city's first institution of higher learning, the Junín Regional University (CURJ), was established in 1990; fused with its nearby, Pergamino counterpart, it became the National University of Northwestern Buenos Aires (UNNOBA), in 2002. The public Dr. Abraham Piñeyro Emergency Hospital, opened in 1930, serves as the city's main health-care establishment; a new wing was added to the facility in 1997.

Famous people from Junín include:

- Argentine supermodel Yesica Toscanini (1986- )
- Tour de France cyclist Juan Antonio Flecha (1977- )
- football greats such as coach Osvaldo Zubeldía (1927-1982), forward Atilio García (1914-1973) and goalie Federico Vilar (1977- )
- the "wild bull of the pampas", boxer Luis Ángel Firpo (1894-1960)
- Elvira Rawson de Dellepiane (1867-1954), a militant suffragist and the second woman to receive a medical degree in Argentina
- Eva Duarte (1919-1952), raised in Junín, moved to Buenos Aires in 1935 to pursue opportunities in radio. A decade later, she became the influential Eva Perón (Evita).
- A UCR figure, Moisés Lebensohn (1907-1953), founded the city's leading news daily, Democracia, in 1931.

The city's mayor, elected in 2015, is Pablo Petrecca of Cambienos-PRO.

== Gallery ==
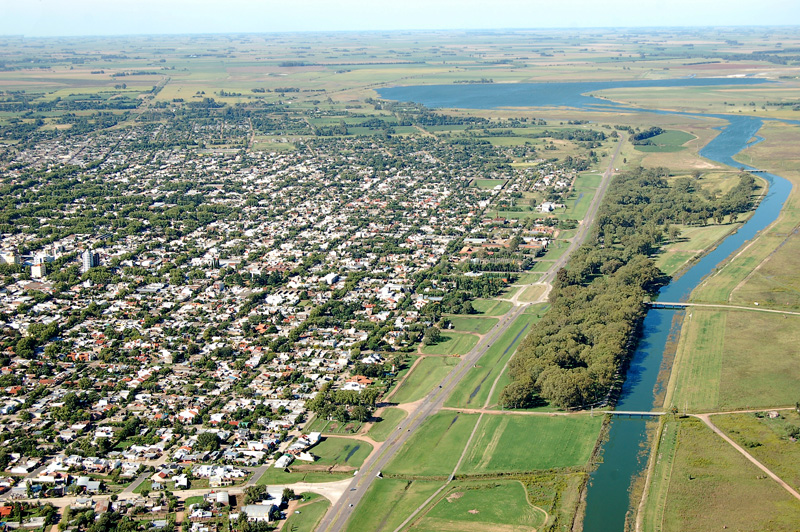
View of Junín and the Río Salado

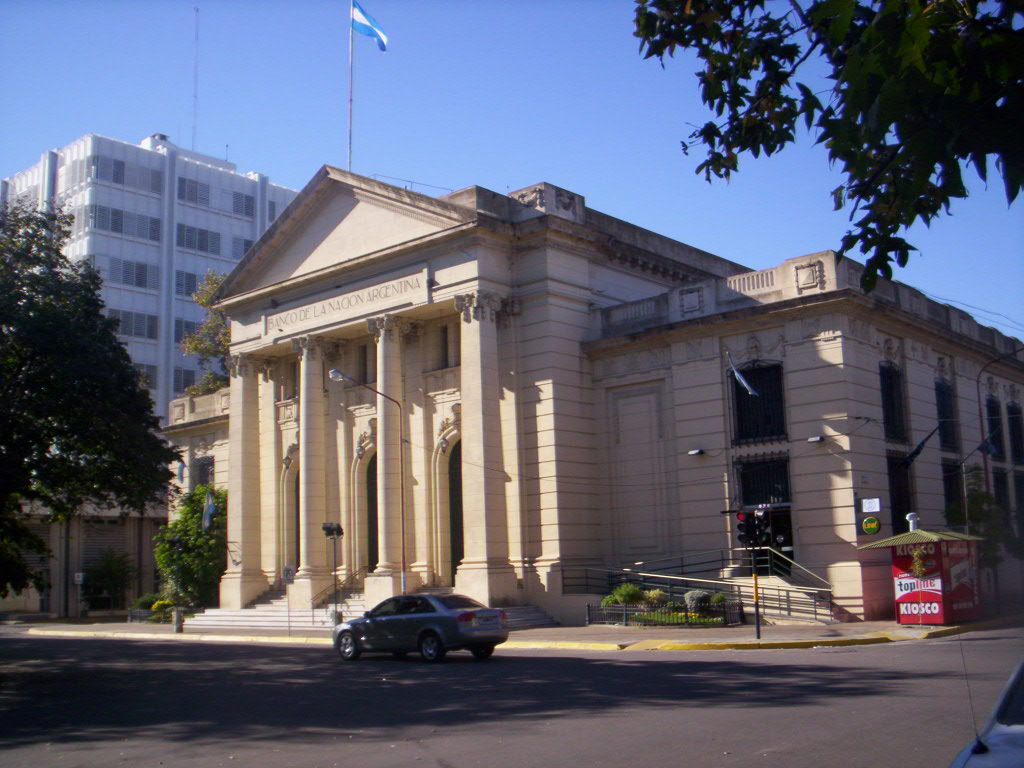
Local branch of the National Bank of Argentina

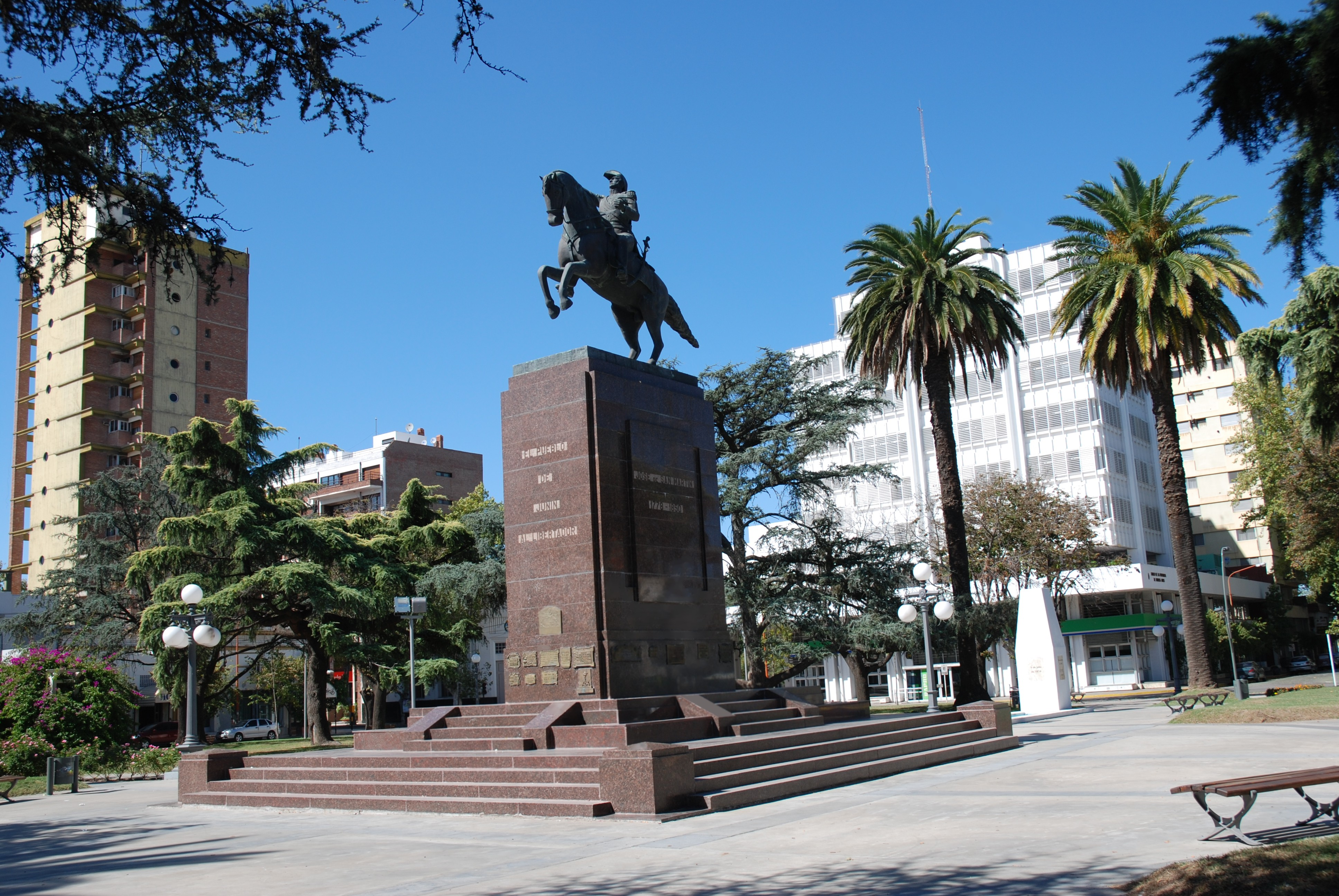
25 May Square

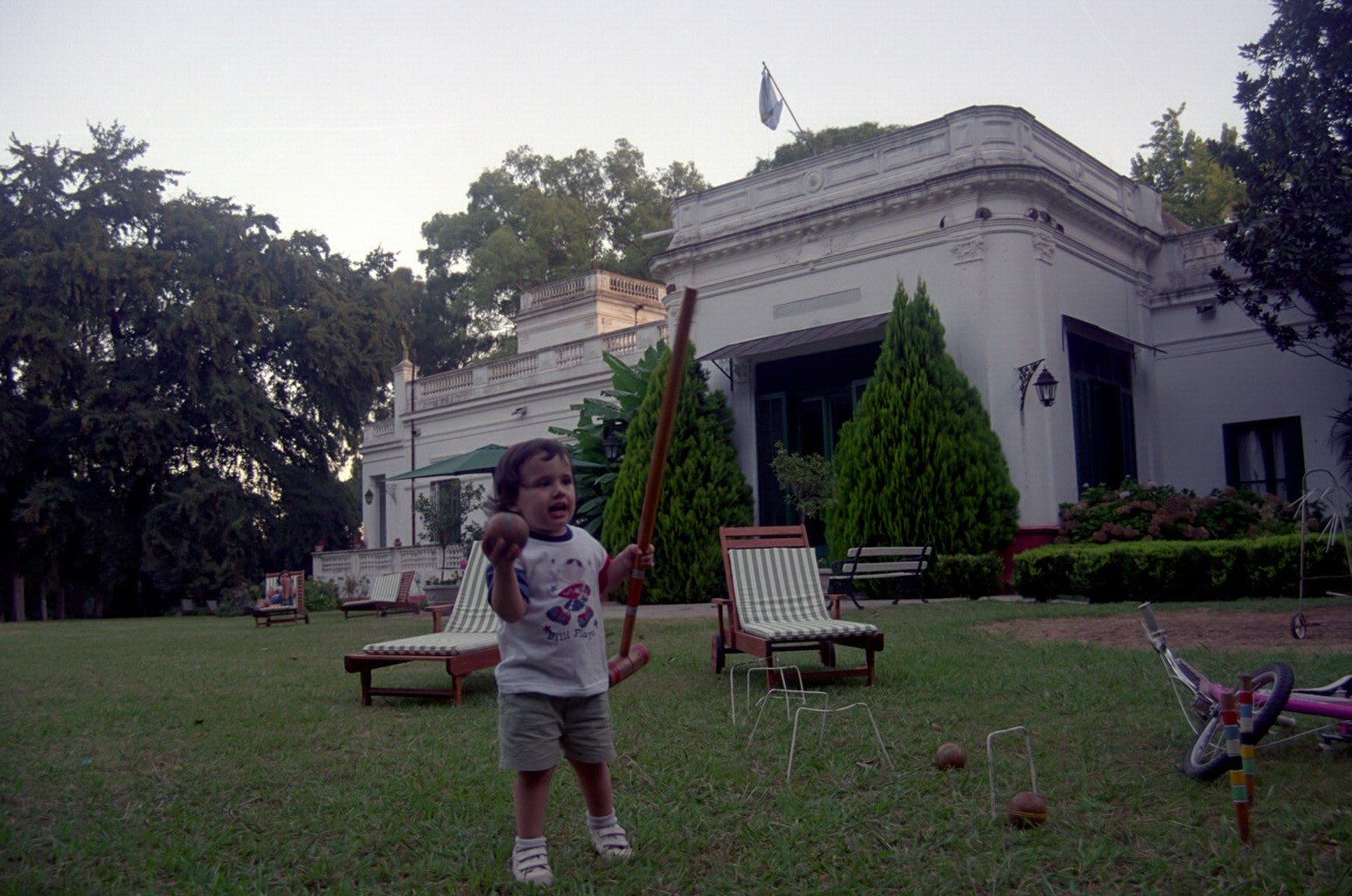
Estancia La Oriental

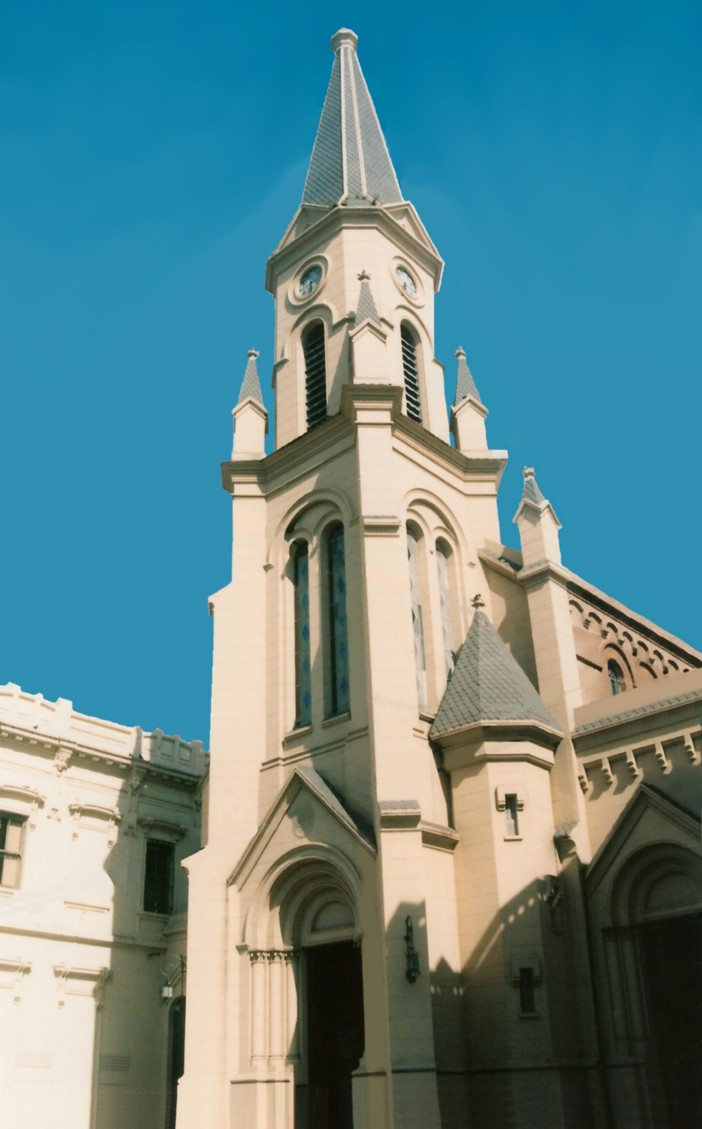
Church of St. Ignatius of Loyola

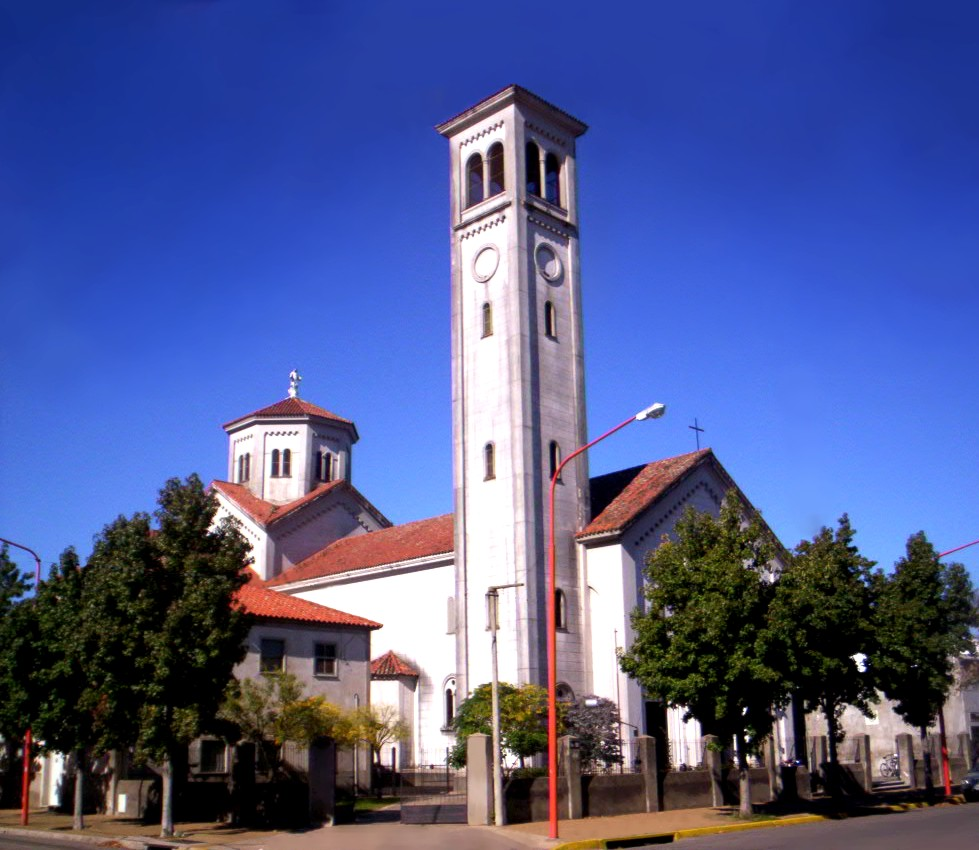
Church of the Sacred Heart

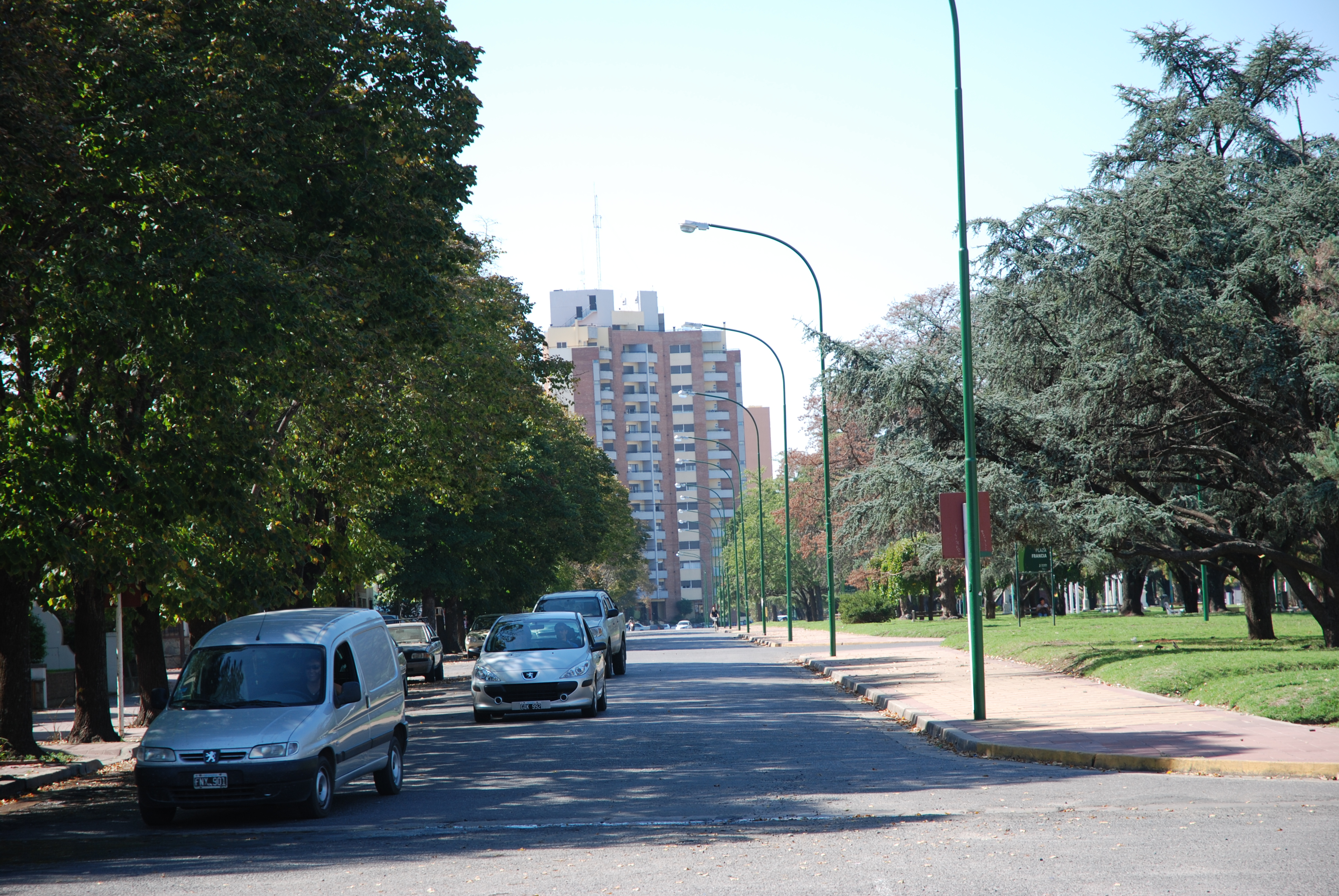
San Martín Avenue

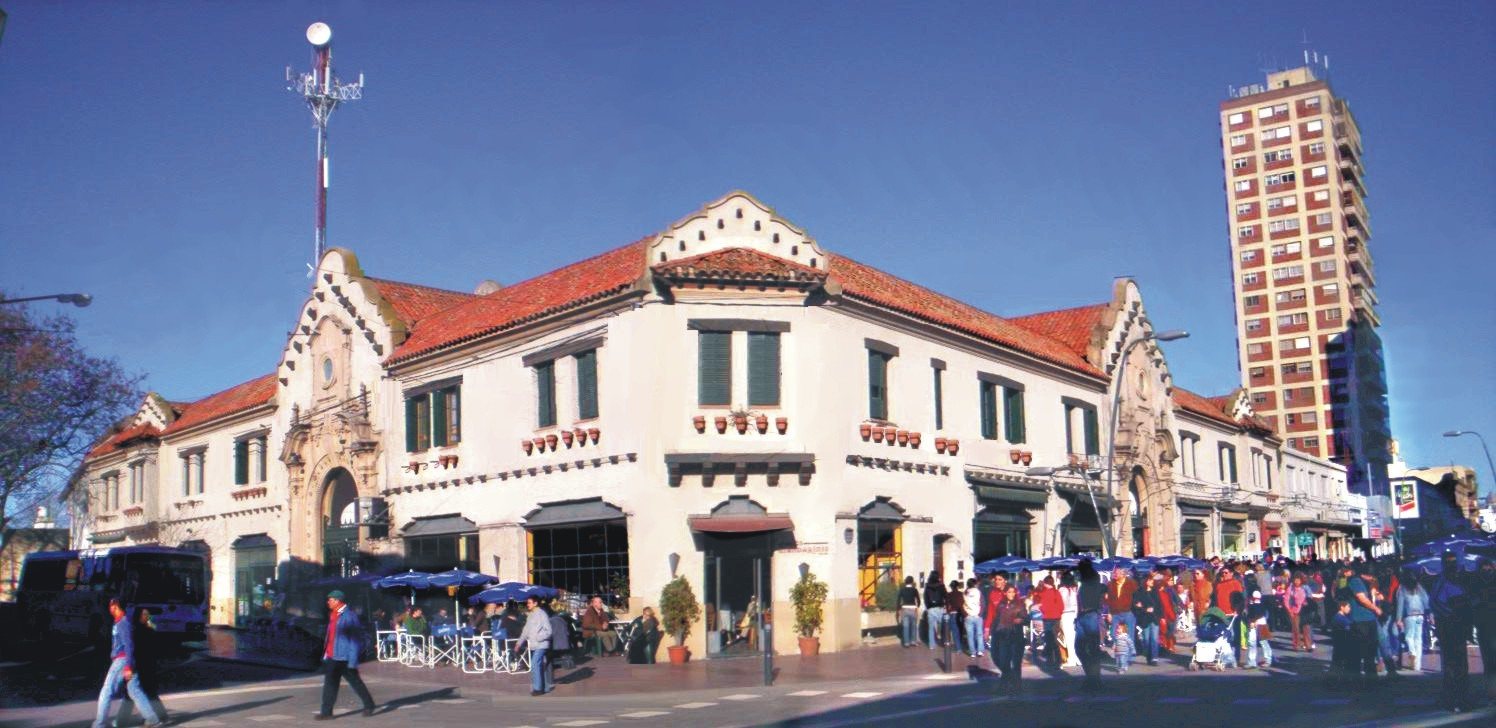
The Ángel María de Rosa Museum of Art

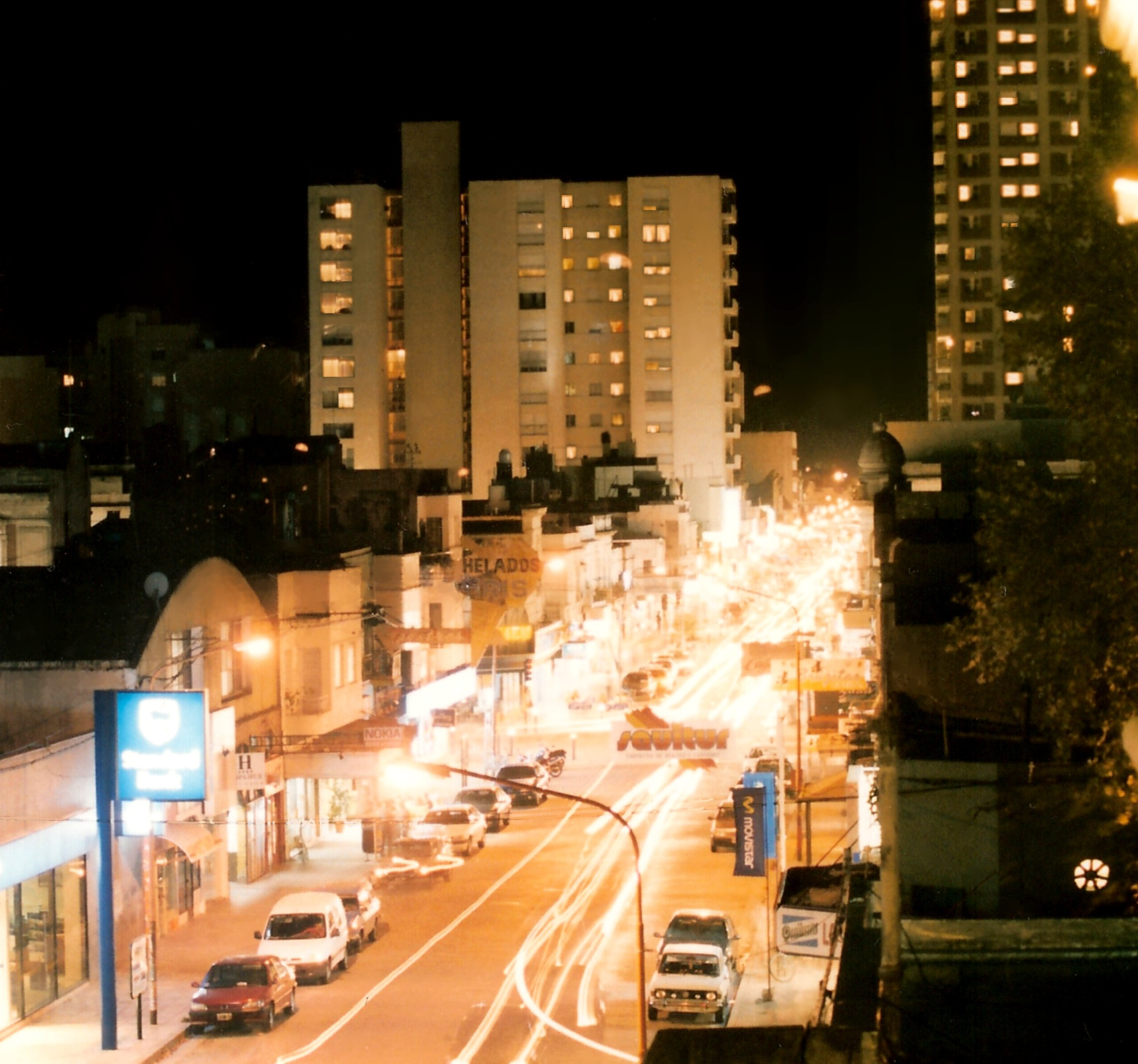
Sáenz Peña Avenue

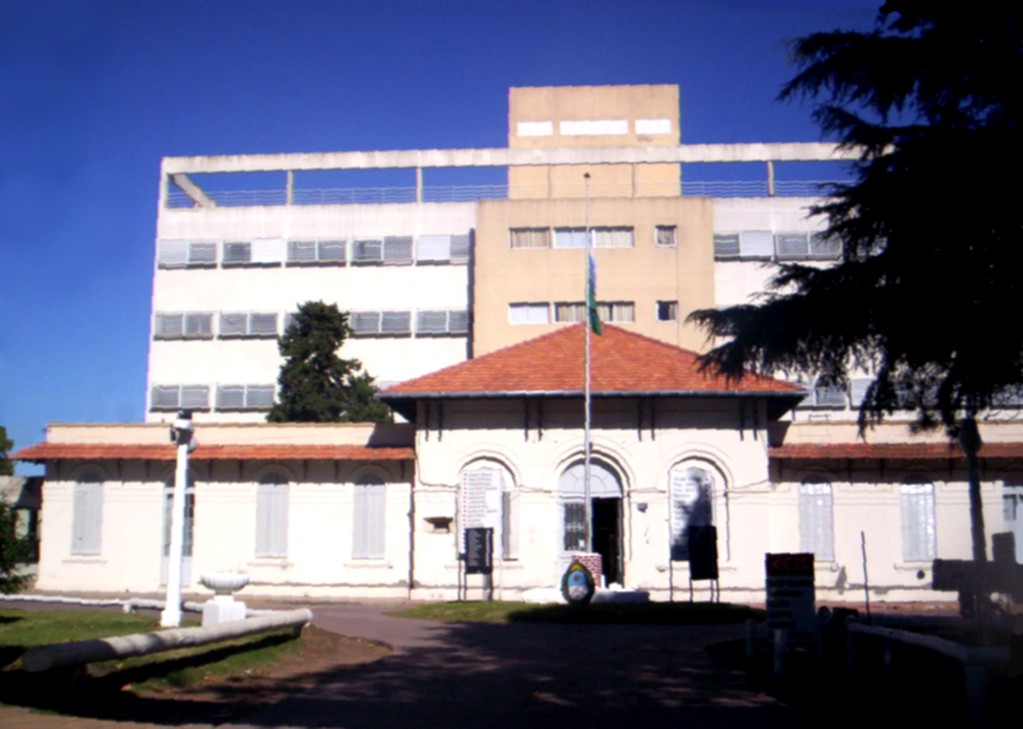
Abraham Piñeyro Hospital

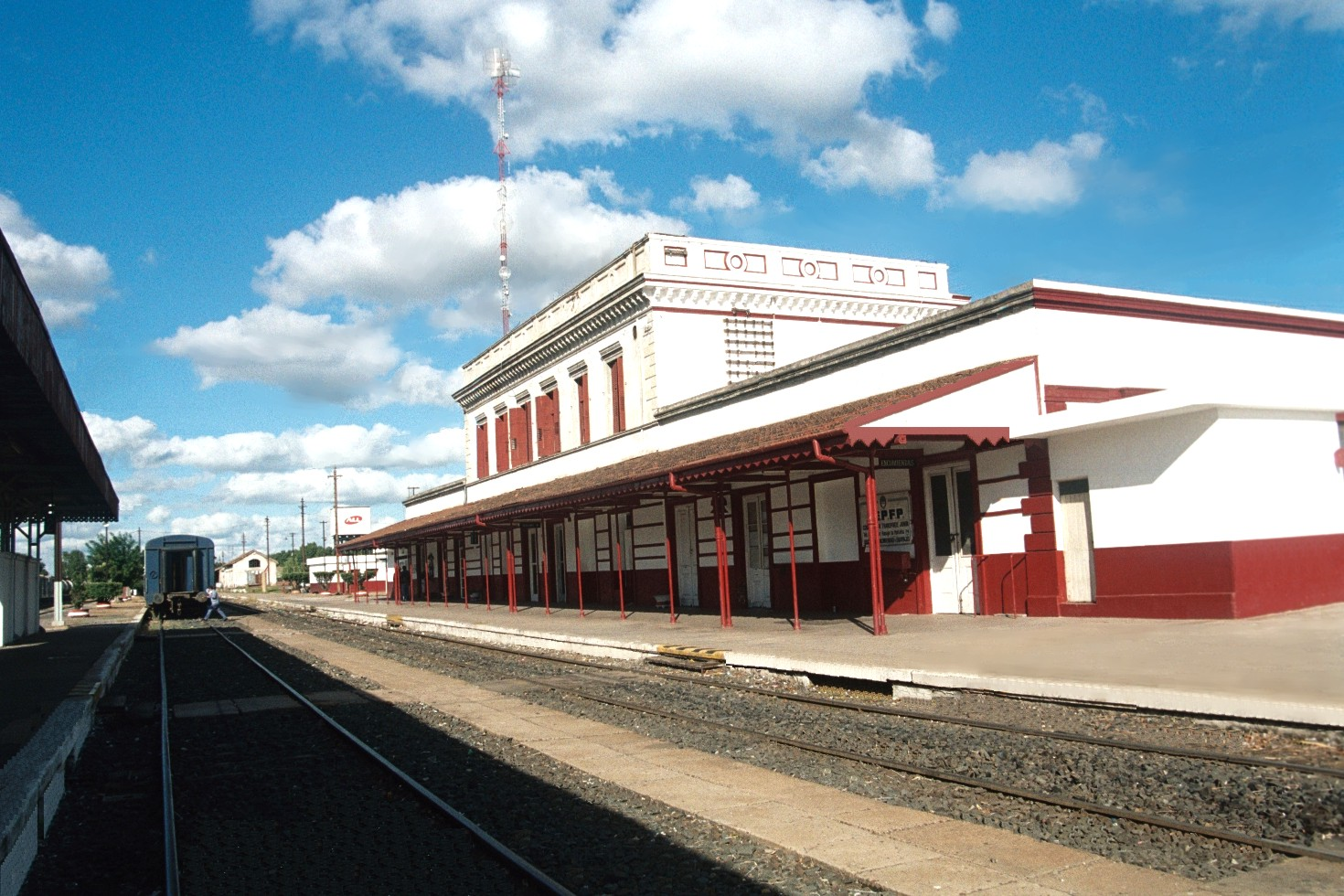
Junín Railway Station

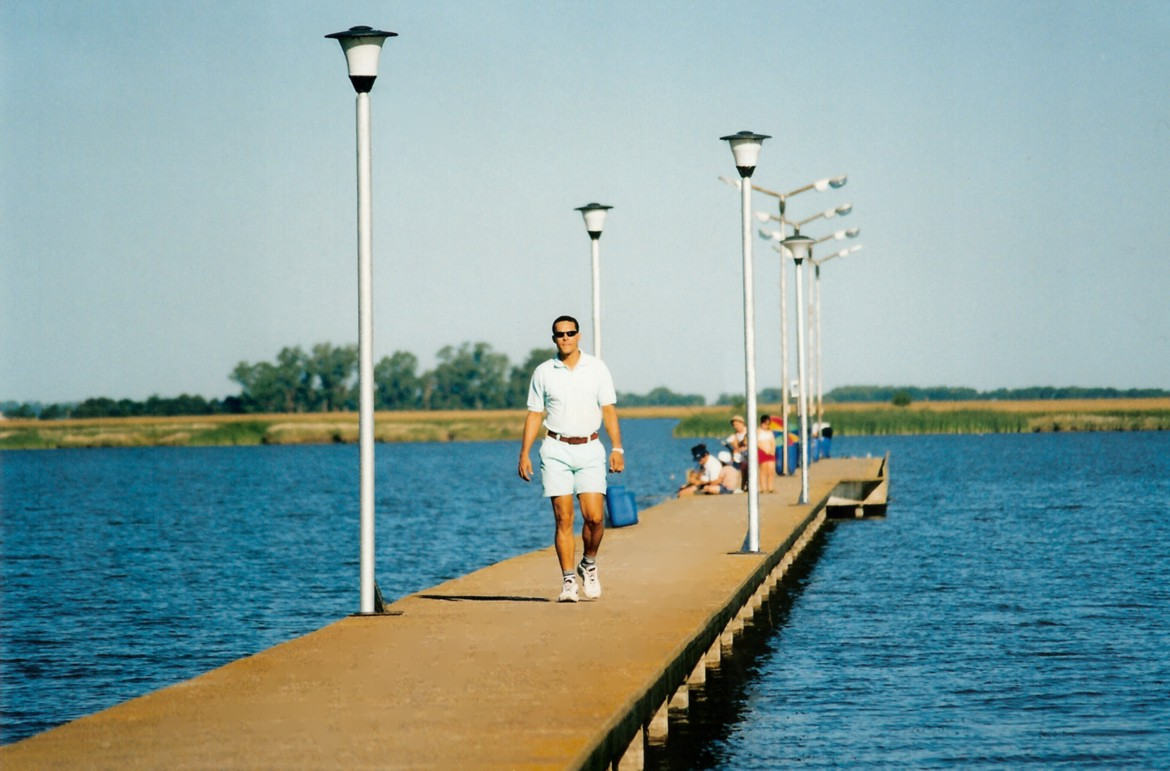
Fishermen's Pier on Lake El Carpincho

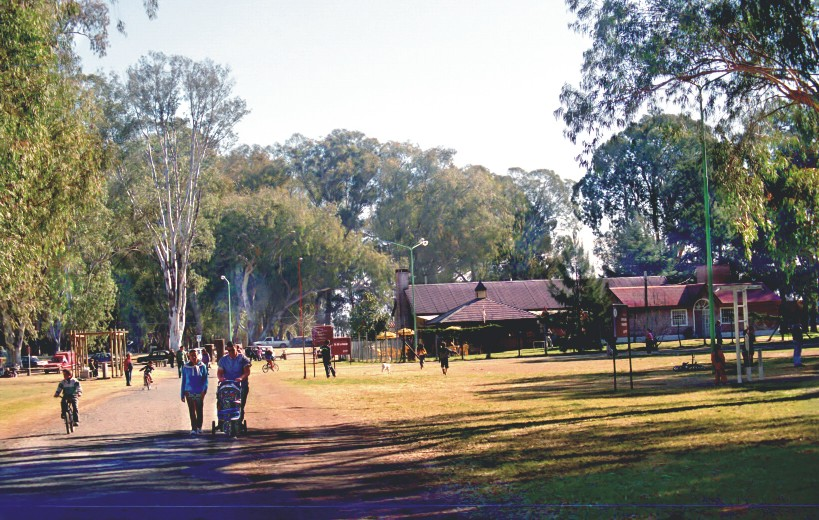
Mayor Borchex Municipal Park

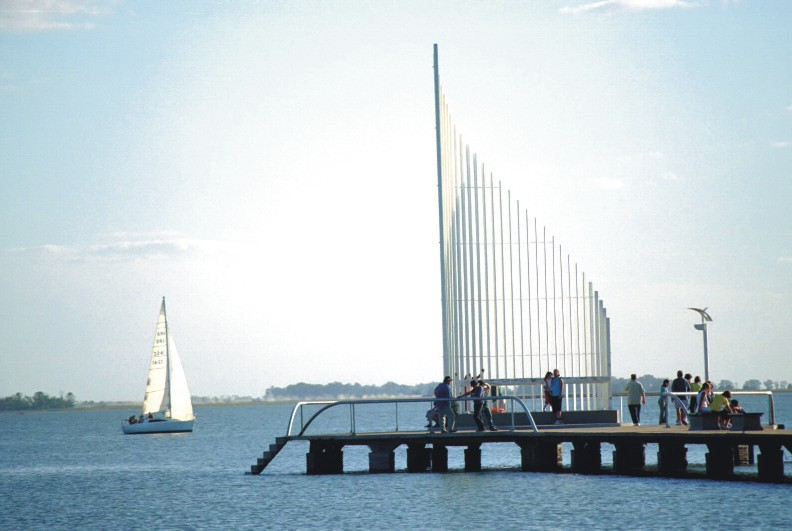
Pier on Lake Gómez

== Education ==
Junín is an important educational center in the northwest of Buenos Aires Province. It is home to the National University of the Northwest of the Province of Buenos Aires (UNNOBA), a public university established in 2002, whose main campus and rectorate are located in Junín. The university offers undergraduate and graduate programs in fields such as technology, agricultural sciences, economics, law, and social sciences, attracting students from across the region.

== Climate ==
Junín has a humid subtropical climate (Köppen climate classification Cfa). Winters are characterized with moderate temperatures during the day and cold nights. In the coldest month, July, the average high is 15.1 °C (59.2 °F) while the average low is 4.2 °C (39.6 °F). Temperatures can sometimes fall below freezing during cold waves, although during heat waves such as the 2009 heat wave, temperatures can reach up to 35 °C (95.0 °F) when a record high of 35.3 °C (95.5 °F) was recorded on August 29, 2009. During this time of the year, overcast days are more common, averaging 9–11 days a month, although sunny days are common as well with 7-11 clear days per month from June to September. Spring and fall are transition seasons featuring warm daytime temperatures and cool nighttime temperatures and are highly shifting with some days reaching 37.6 °C (99.7 °F) and below −9.2 °C (15.4 °F). Summers are hot in the day while nights are mild. They tend to be sunnier than the other seasons, averaging 8–11 clear days with less overcast days (only 6 per month). In the hottest month, January, the average high is 30.2 °C (86.4 °F) while the average low is 16.2 °C (61.2 °F). The average relative humidity is 75%, with the summer months being drier than the winter months. The average first date of frost is on May 20 while the last date of frost is on September 11. This can vary from year to year with frosts that can extend into November or happen as early as April. Junín is moderately windy throughout the whole year with wind speeds ranging from a low of 8.6 kilometres per hour (5.3 mph) in April to 14.4 kilometres per hour (8.9 mph) in September. On average, Junín receives 993.4 millimetres (39 in) of precipitation a year with 85 days with measureable precipitation with summer months being wetter than the winter months, where most of the precipitation falls in the form of thunderstorms. Junín gets approximately 2,569.3 hours of bright sunshine a year or 57% of possible sunshine a year, ranging from a low of 46% in June (only 138.0 hours of sunshine per month) to a high of 66% in both January and February. The highest recorded temperature was 41.8 °C (107.2 °F) on December 29, 1971 while the lowest recorded temperature was −9.2 °C (15.4 °F) on June 14, 1967.

Climate data for Junín, Buenos Aires (1991–2020 normals, extremes 1961–present)
Month	Jan	Feb	Mar	Apr	May	Jun	Jul	Aug	Sep	Oct	Nov	Dec	Year
Record high °C (°F)	42.1 (107.8)	39.7 (103.5)	38.5 (101.3)	34.5 (94.1)	31.8 (89.2)	27.6 (81.7)	30.8 (87.4)	35.3 (95.5)	37.0 (98.6)	37.4 (99.3)	39.7 (103.5)	41.8 (107.2)	42.1 (107.8)
Mean daily maximum °C (°F)	29.8 (85.6)	28.4 (83.1)	26.9 (80.4)	23.1 (73.6)	19.2 (66.6)	16.0 (60.8)	15.2 (59.4)	18.1 (64.6)	20.2 (68.4)	22.7 (72.9)	26.5 (79.7)	29.2 (84.6)	22.9 (73.2)
Daily mean °C (°F)	23.0 (73.4)	21.6 (70.9)	19.7 (67.5)	16.1 (61.0)	12.7 (54.9)	9.5 (49.1)	8.7 (47.7)	10.7 (51.3)	13.2 (55.8)	16.3 (61.3)	19.6 (67.3)	22.1 (71.8)	16.1 (61.0)
Mean daily minimum °C (°F)	16.5 (61.7)	15.6 (60.1)	13.8 (56.8)	10.6 (51.1)	7.6 (45.7)	4.4 (39.9)	3.4 (38.1)	4.7 (40.5)	6.9 (44.4)	10.2 (50.4)	12.8 (55.0)	15.1 (59.2)	10.1 (50.2)
Record low °C (°F)	6.0 (42.8)	5.0 (41.0)	1.0 (33.8)	−3.4 (25.9)	−7.5 (18.5)	−9.2 (15.4)	−8.0 (17.6)	−7.0 (19.4)	−5.4 (22.3)	−3.4 (25.9)	1.2 (34.2)	2.2 (36.0)	−9.2 (15.4)
Average precipitation mm (inches)	129.2 (5.09)	115.0 (4.53)	128.3 (5.05)	127.5 (5.02)	75.7 (2.98)	31.4 (1.24)	29.7 (1.17)	40.8 (1.61)	60.3 (2.37)	134.2 (5.28)	112.1 (4.41)	121.0 (4.76)	1,105.2 (43.51)
Average precipitation days (≥ 0.1 mm)	8.1	7.8	8.2	8.1	5.8	4.2	4.3	4.0	6.0	10.2	8.4	8.7	83.7
Average snowy days	0.0	0.0	0.0	0.0	0.0	0.0	0.1	0.1	0.0	0.0	0.0	0.0	0.1
Average relative humidity (%)	69.6	74.6	75.9	75.8	78.9	78.0	75.7	70.6	68.3	70.7	65.7	64.5	72.4
Mean monthly sunshine hours	285.2	245.8	229.4	189.0	164.3	141.0	158.1	180.0	192.0	217.0	258.0	272.8	2,532.6
Mean daily sunshine hours	9.2	8.7	7.4	6.3	5.3	4.7	5.1	6.0	6.4	7.0	8.6	8.8	7.0
Percentage possible sunshine	66	66	60	59	53	46	48	55	57	56	62	61	57
Source 1: Servicio Meteorológico Nacional
Source 2: NOAA (percent sun 1961–1990)

== Transportation ==
The city is served by Junín Airport, which has no commercial air service but has had so in the past.

== Notable people ==
- Juan Antonio Flecha, cyclist
- Luis Angel Firpo, boxer
- Eva Perón, Argentine First Lady
- Gabriel Ponce de León, racing driver
- Mariana Anghileri, actress
