= Pergamino =

City in Buenos Aires Province, Argentina

- City
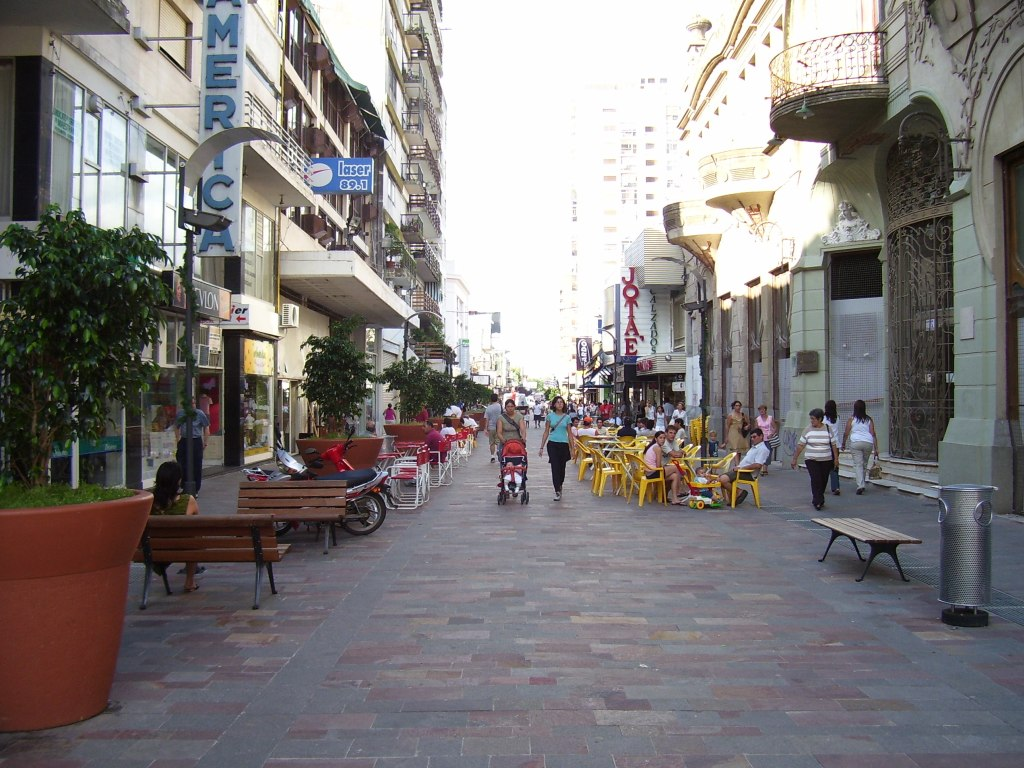
- San Nicolás Street, Pergamino.

- Pergamino
- Coordinates: 33°53′S 60°34′W
- Country: Argentina
- Province: Buenos Aires
- Partido: Pergamino
- Foundation: 1749
- Elevation: 56 m (184 ft)

Population (2010 census [INDEC])
  - Total: 104,985
- CPA Base: B 2700
- Area code: +54 2477
- Website: Official website

Pergamino (Spanish pronunciation: [peɾɣaˈmino]) is an Argentine city in the Province of Buenos Aires. It has a population of about 104,985 inhabitants as per the 2010 census [INDEC] and is the administrative seat of its county, Pergamino Partido. Its UN/LOCODE is ARPGO.

== History ==
Long valued for its many springs and fertile land, the area had been home to the Charrúa and Araucanian people when it was first noticed by Spanish colonist around 1620. Becoming a posada along the trade route between colonial Buenos Aires and Córdoba, the settlement was given its name on 3 January 1626, for the parchment paper (document lost by a group of Spaniards) found there and conforming to an Araucanian term meaning "red soil."

The settlement's first businesses were established in 1700 and in 1749, recurrent attacks by displaced natives led to the construction of a fort. These attacks did not cease, however, and on 8 August 1751 the settlement was destroyed. The site continued to be of interest, and Commander Juan González ordered the village rebuilt on orders from the Buenos Aires colonial government in 1769. The Curate of nearby Arrecifes ordained a Parish in Pergamino in 1779 and the new Viceroyalty of Río de la Plata assigned the area a partido (county) in 1784. The fort played a prominent role during the initial battles in the war for independence and, in 1815, was the site of a mutiny led by Col. Ignacio Álvarez Thomas against the fledgling nation's Head of State, Director Carlos María de Alvear. Col. Álvarez Thomas' coup d'état against Director de Alvear's brief though highly divisive autocracy averted the dissolution of the United Provinces of the River Plate, the confederacy that later became Argentina.

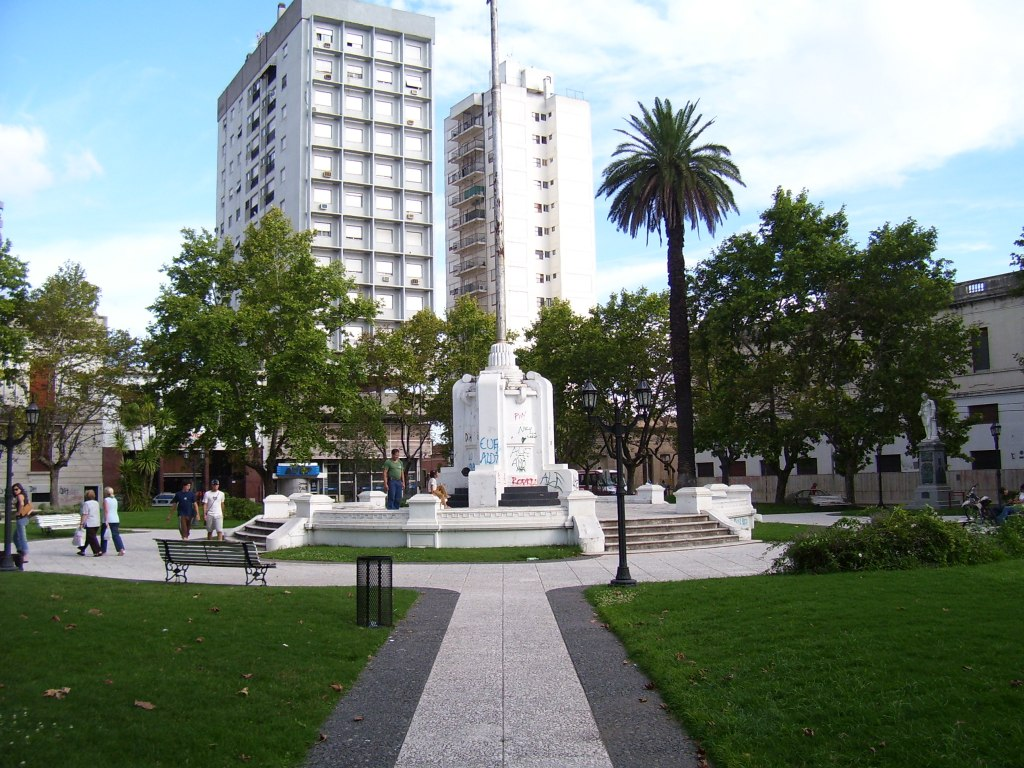
Merced Plaza.

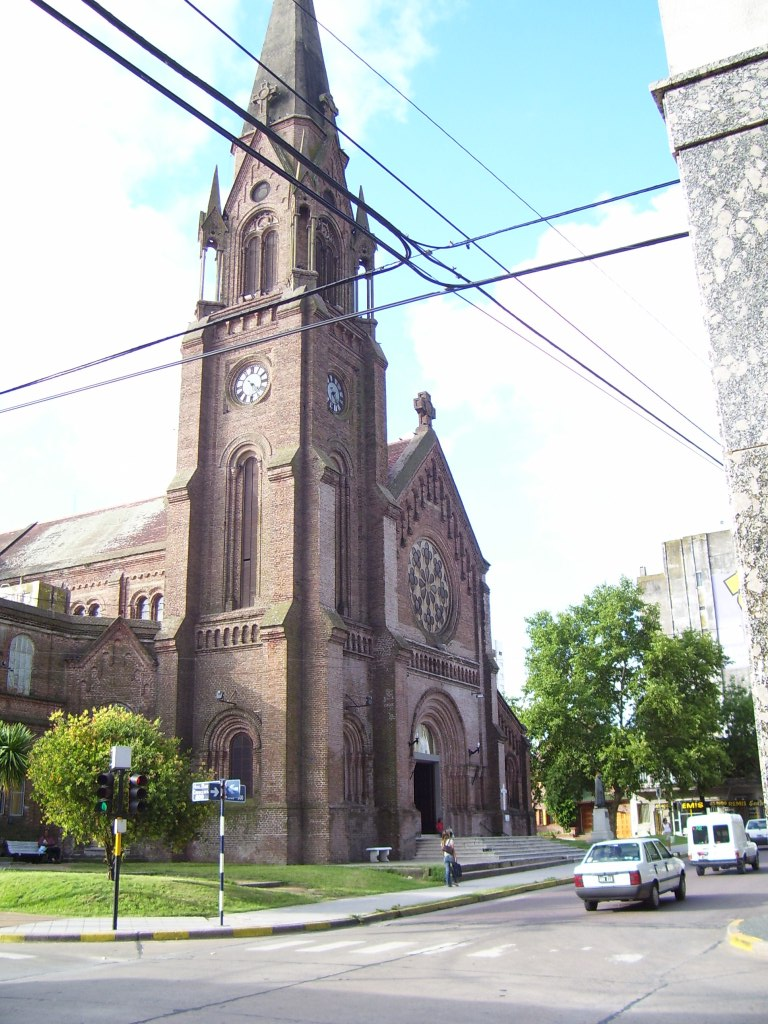
Church of Our Lady of Mercy.

Following the struggle for independence, the progressive new Governor of Buenos Aires, Martín Rodríguez, assigned Pergamino a Justice of the Peace in 1822 and the first school was opened in 1828. The town soon became home to a number of abattoirs and following the 1829 rise of Governor Juan Manuel de Rosas (whose family interests centered around cattle-raising) a close alliance developed between the governor and Pergamino's most prominent families, the Acevedos and the Anchorenas; Rosas' repressive regime, however, resulted in the sole school's closure in 1838. Following Governor Rosas' 1852 overthrow, the local gentry allied themselves to Bartolomé Mitre, a prominent advocate on behalf of Buenos Aires Province for greater autonomy. Mitre was elected governor in 1860 and President of Argentina in 1862. President Mitre's 1862 establishment of Argentina's first institute of Agronomy helped lead to the development of a new economic activity in the region around Pergamino: intensive agriculture. The first Argentine grain shipment to arrive intact in the United Kingdom in 1875 touched off an agricultural boom that for Pergamino, resulted in the massive cultivation of maïze. The city's growth accelerated further upon the arrival of the Central Argentine Railway in 1882, en route to Rosario. Pergamino, whose population by then exceeded 10,000 and home to over 90 registered businesses, was formally designated as a city on 23 October 1895.

Continuing to rely economically on maize, local landowners funded the establishment of an agricultural laboratory in 1912. Pergamino's population, now mostly European immigrants and their children, nearly tripled to almost 30,000 between 1895 and 1914; this era saw the establishment of important Basque, Piemontese, Provençal and Lebanese communities, as well as the inauguration of the Hotel Roma in 1913, one of the best-known Art Nouveau structures in the area. One immigrant from the Piedmont, Enrique Venini, founded Pergamino's first newspaper, La Opinión, in 1917. The city's growing immigrant communities also included a sizable contingent of British railway engineers and other technicians associated with the rapidly expanding railways. A number of these staffers and the Central Argentine Railway's director, Ronald Leslie, organized Pergamino's first football team on 18 November 1918, christening it in honor of a British Field Marshal famed for his roles in the Boer War and in World War I, Gen. Douglas Haig. Club Atlético Douglas Haig has enjoyed regional prominence in the Argentine B League.

Pergamino's main church and city hall were both completed in 1930. Following a decade of prosperity, however, the Great Depression led to the ruin of the majority of the area's small landholders. The city soon began to recover, and celebrated the opening of the Municipal Fine Arts Museum in 1936, for instance. A devastating flood in 1939 led to construction of levees and canals along the Pergamino River. Growing to nearly 50,000 people by 1947, the city's first large manufacturing establishments began to operate at this time. Pergamino's agricultural sector, however, was strained by the creation of a national export grain purchaser, the IAPI, by President Juan Perón in 1946; although Pergamino benefited from IAPI investment in irrigation and other infrastructure works, the low prices the agency paid local growers also led to the bankruptcy of number. The dissolution of the IAPI following Perón's overthrow in 1955 and the 1956 establishment of the National Agricultural Laboratory (INTA) in Pergamino helped revitalize the sector in the area and nationally.

The elections of 1963 carried a native of Pergamino, Dr. Arturo Illia, to the Presidency; President Illia prioritized economic growth while keeping national budgets nearly balanced, the combination of which helped lead to unprecedented growth in Pergamino. The city's first high-rises were built, as well as the industrial district; President Illia graced his birthplace with numerous visits during his tenure. Another native of Pergamino, Héctor Chavero, became nationally renowned during that era after releasing an album of folklore ballads and narration, El payador perseguido ("The Persecuted Troubadour"); by then, he was known by his pseudonym, Atahualpa Yupanqui and has remained, long after his death in 1992, arguably the most influential musician of his genre in Argentina.

One of Pergamino's Lebanese immigrants, Isaac Annan, established the city's first garment factory during the late 1940s, creating Far West Jeans and Manhattan Shirts, two of Argentina's best-known domestic clothing brands. By 1970, Wrangler Jeans, Fiorucci, Levi's, Lee Jeans and a number of local firms, had established large textile plants, employing about 6,000. Roberto Genoud, the son of French immigrants, established the area's largest lumber and furniture factory. Pergamino continued to grow, reaching a population of 70,000 in 1980, becoming northern Buenos Aires Province's industrial center. Economic instability nationwide began to take its toll on that sector after 1975, however, and by 1985 a number of local textile manufacturers had closed or were replaced by smaller cooperatives. The city was chosen as the site for the prestigious National Viral Research Institute (INEVH) in 1978, and was home to one of the nation's first cable television stations in 1985. The city's main daily, La Opinión, closed in 1989 amid a national economic crisis. Financially distressed, the daily's founders, the Veninis, sold the company to local cable TV entrepreneur Hugo Apesteguía, the current owner.

Serious floods in 1939, 1975, 1984 and 1995 underscored the need for more investments in infrastructure and by 2002, the combined effects of a wave of imports and an acute economic crisis led to the closure of most of Pergamino's industries and many of its retail establishments; the textile industry, in particular, was reduced to about 600 workers; amid rising unemployment, crime rates and general pessimism, one of the most notable achievements in that difficult era was the establishment of the Pergamino Regional University, the city's first institution of higher learning, in 1993. The school was absorbed into the National University of Northwestern Buenos Aires upon that latter entity's creation in 2002, and its Pergamino campus today enrolls about 500 students yearly.

== The city today ==
The economic recovery Argentina began to experience in 2003 has led to a dramatic recovery in the city's industrial base, as well the area's agricultural production; in 2003 alone, the city saw 2,500 manufacturing jobs return. The county's 2,950 km^{2} (1,139 sq mi) is dedicated almost entirely to agriculture and, though local farmers have diversified into poultry and dairy production, Pergamino still plays an important role in Argentina's cereal harvest, particularly soy and maize, as well as being home to half the national sales of seed for cultivation; as such, the city was declared National Capital of the Seed in 1998. Even so, agricultural employment accounts for only 8% of the county's total and employment in manufacturing, which has growing by about 13% annually, accounted for 22% of the total in 2006, or about 10,000 jobs. Though still led by the textile and lumber industries, manufacturing in Pergamino is more diversified than in the past and these two sectors today employ less than a third of industrial labor. Pergamino's financial sector has likewise recovered: the value of locally originated loans nearly doubled between 2002 and 2006, reaching US$52 million and local deposits nearly tripled, reaching almost US$100 million.

The mayor of Pergamino, Dr. Héctor Gutiérrez, is (as most of the city's past mayors) affiliated with the centrist Radical Civic Union, Argentina's oldest continuously existing political party. Elected in 1999, he has capitalized on the city's economic recovery by emphasizing public works and in 2005, successfully lobbied the Administration of President Néstor Kirchner for a 180 km (112 mi) extension of the Route 8 expressway into Pergamino, a long-overdue improvement for one of the nation's most-transited stretches of two-lane road.

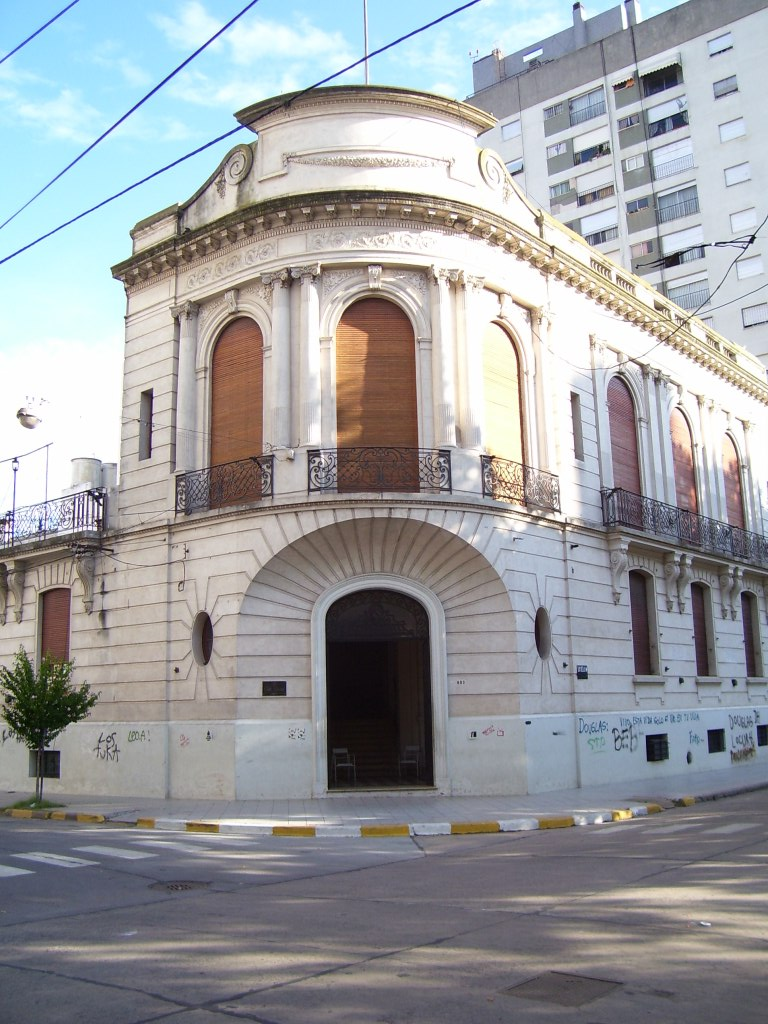
The Pergamino Social Club.

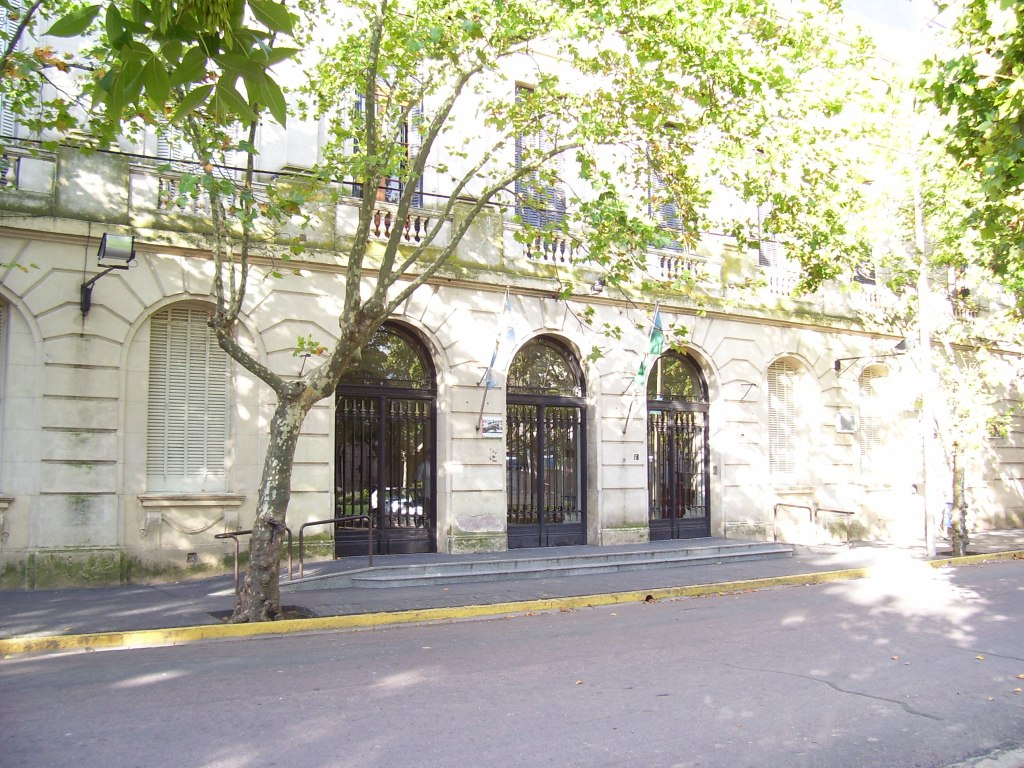
City Hall.

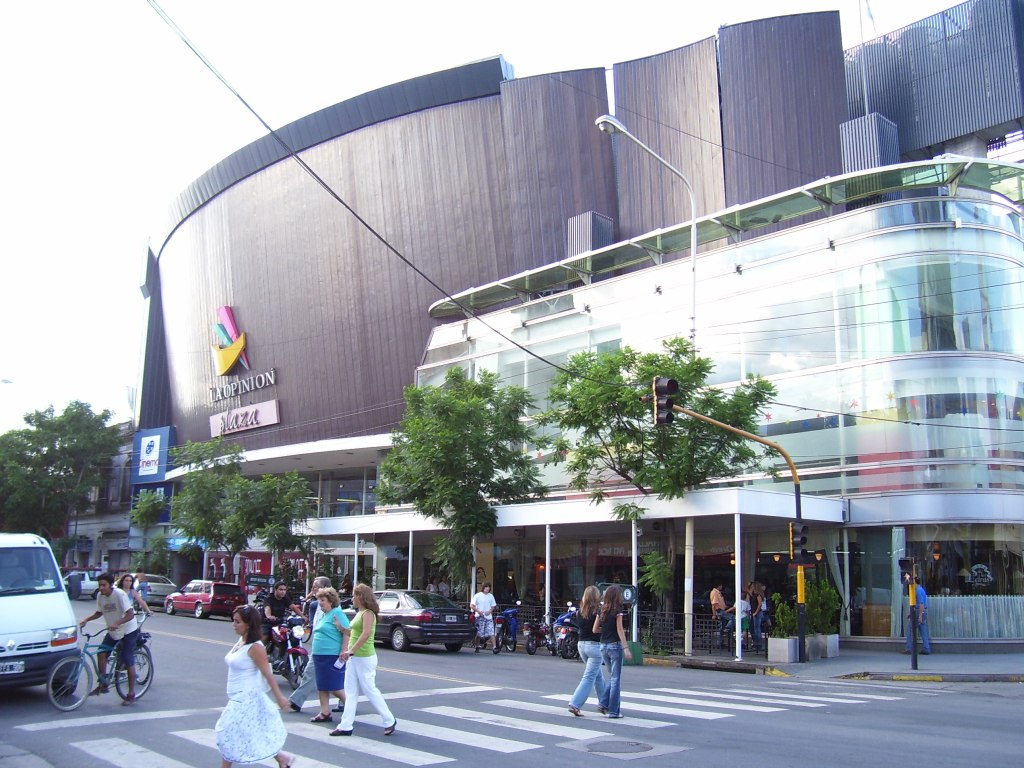
La Opinión Plaza, the new headquarters of the local news daily.

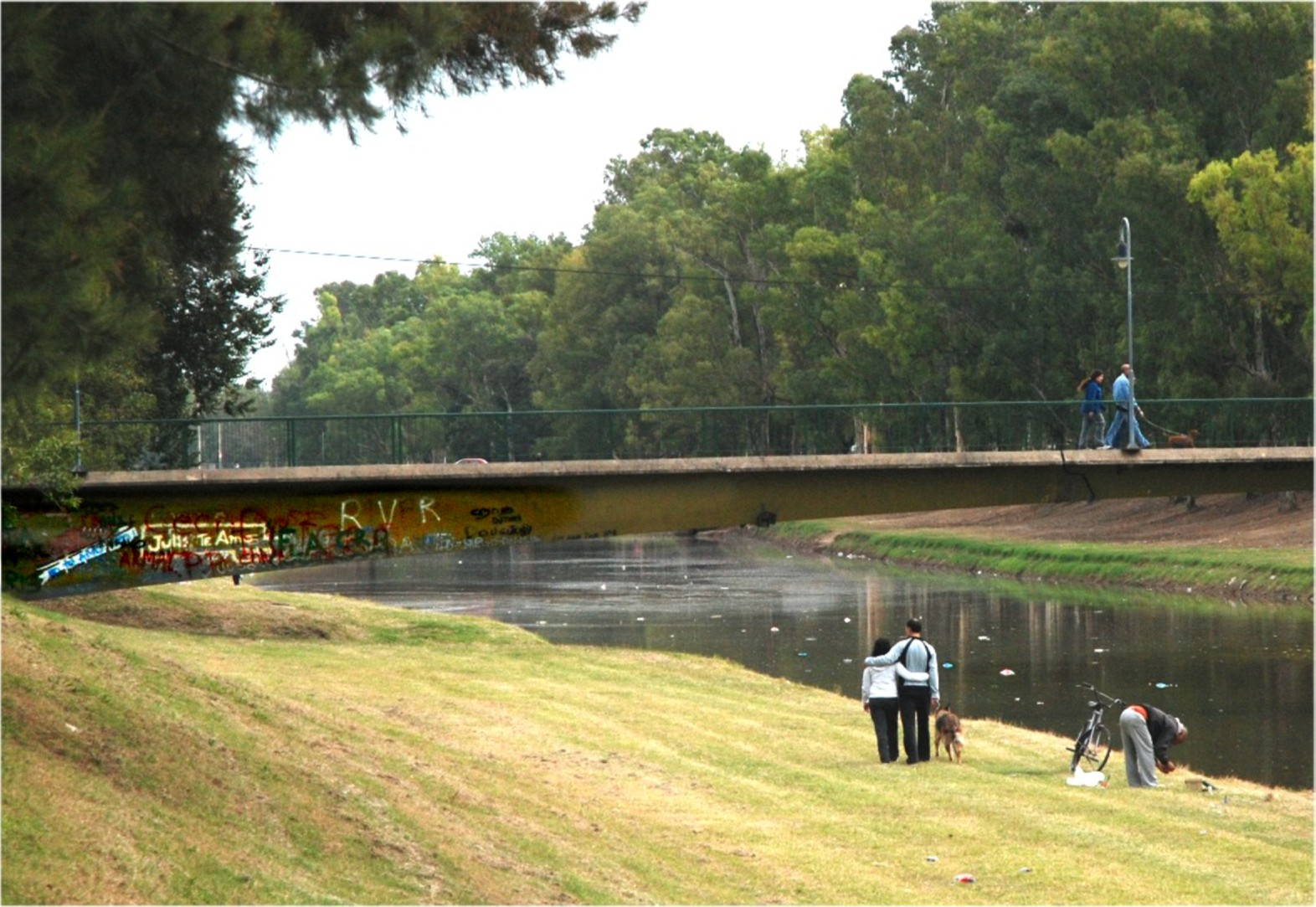
Pergamino Stream Park

== Climate ==
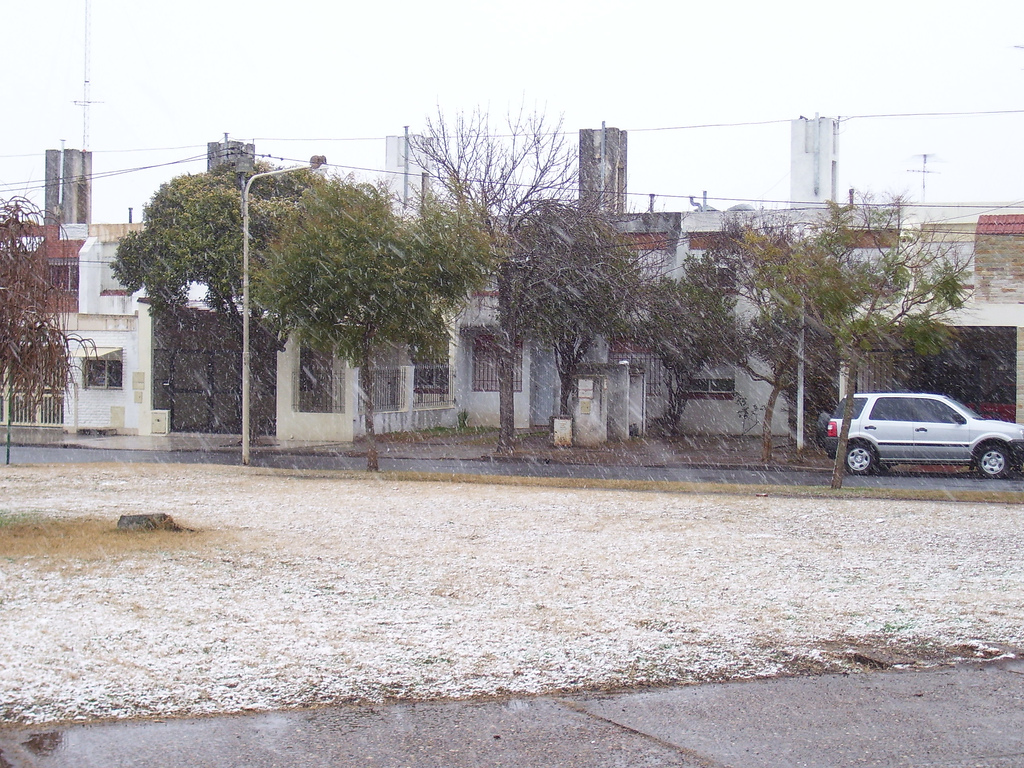
Snow in 2007, Pergamino's first since 1975.

Pergamino has a humid subtropical climate (Köppen climate classification Cfa) with hot, humid summers and mild to cool winters. The highest temperature recorded was 41.9 °C (107 °F) on January 9, 2012 while the lowest temperature recorded was −10.8 °C (13 °F) on June 14, 1967.

Climate data for Pergamino (1961–1990, extremes 1967–present)
Month	Jan	Feb	Mar	Apr	May	Jun	Jul	Aug	Sep	Oct	Nov	Dec	Year
Record high °C (°F)	41.9 (107.4)	39.3 (102.7)	35.9 (96.6)	34.8 (94.6)	32.0 (89.6)	27.8 (82.0)	31.3 (88.3)	35.2 (95.4)	36.5 (97.7)	37.5 (99.5)	39.0 (102.2)	40.3 (104.5)	41.9 (107.4)
Mean daily maximum °C (°F)	30.5 (86.9)	29.1 (84.4)	26.5 (79.7)	23.1 (73.6)	19.6 (67.3)	15.6 (60.1)	15.5 (59.9)	17.4 (63.3)	19.8 (67.6)	22.4 (72.3)	25.7 (78.3)	29.2 (84.6)	22.9 (73.2)
Daily mean °C (°F)	23.8 (74.8)	22.4 (72.3)	19.9 (67.8)	16.4 (61.5)	13.1 (55.6)	9.3 (48.7)	9.8 (49.6)	11.0 (51.8)	13.5 (56.3)	16.2 (61.2)	19.4 (66.9)	22.5 (72.5)	16.4 (61.5)
Mean daily minimum °C (°F)	16.7 (62.1)	16.0 (60.8)	14.0 (57.2)	10.6 (51.1)	7.6 (45.7)	4.4 (39.9)	4.8 (40.6)	5.1 (41.2)	6.8 (44.2)	10.0 (50.0)	12.8 (55.0)	15.5 (59.9)	10.4 (50.7)
Record low °C (°F)	5.0 (41.0)	4.0 (39.2)	2.3 (36.1)	−1.8 (28.8)	−6.0 (21.2)	−10.8 (12.6)	−8.5 (16.7)	−6.5 (20.3)	−4.5 (23.9)	−2.5 (27.5)	2.0 (35.6)	2.7 (36.9)	−10.8 (12.6)
Average precipitation mm (inches)	113.9 (4.48)	118.8 (4.68)	142.8 (5.62)	71.8 (2.83)	47.0 (1.85)	30.8 (1.21)	40.7 (1.60)	39.3 (1.55)	58.1 (2.29)	120.1 (4.73)	95.7 (3.77)	93.2 (3.67)	972.2 (38.28)
Average precipitation days (≥ 0.1 mm)	8	8	8	6	6	5	5	5	5	9	8	8	81
Average relative humidity (%)	65	71	76	78	80	81	82	76	71	73	69	65	74
Mean monthly sunshine hours	291.4	248.6	238.7	204.0	182.9	150.0	164.3	201.5	213.0	232.5	270.0	285.2	2,682.1
Percentage possible sunshine	67	66	62	59	54	48	52	58	60	58	63	62	59
Source 1: NOAA, Oficina de Riesgo Agropecuario (record highs and lows)
Source 2: Instituto Nacional de Tecnología Agropecuaria (sun only 1967–2009), Servicio Meteorológico Nacional (precipitation days)

== Notable people ==
- Arturo Umberto Illia former President of Argentina from October 12, 1963, to June 28, 1966, and a member of the centrist UCR
- Atahualpa Yupanqui (22 January 1908 - 23 May 1992) was an Argentine singer, songwriter, guitarist, and writer. He is considered the most important Argentine folk musician of the 20th century.
- Paola Suárez (born 1976 in Pergamino, Buenos Aires, Argentina) was a top 10 tennis player in the early 2000s
- Augusto Fernández, football player for the famous River Plate and Vélez Sársfield Teams.
- Carlos Barbarito, poet
- Hilda Herzer (1938-2012), sociologist, environmentalist and professor
- Jesús Iglesias (1922-2005), racing driver
- José Luis Espert (born 1961), member of the Argentine Chamber of Deputies since December 10, 2021 and former Presidential Candidate in 2019
- Héctor Rial (1928-1991), was a footballer who played as a forward for Real Madrid between 1954 and 1961, and was part of the team that won five consecutive European Cups.

== See also ==
- Pergamino Aeroclub
