= Presidency of Cristina Fernández de Kirchner =

Argentine presidential administration from 2007 to 2015

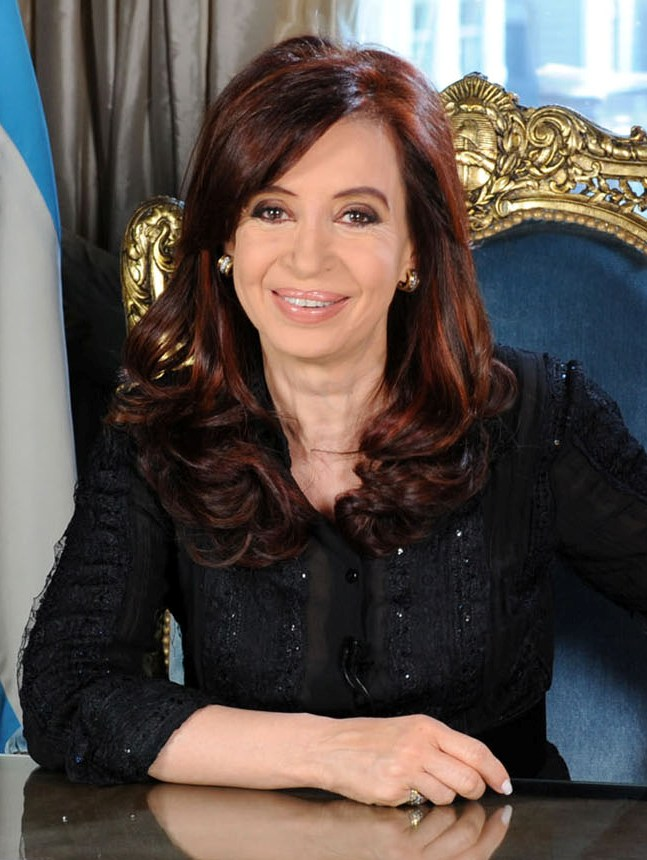
- Fernández de Kirchner in 2010
- Presidency of Cristina Fernández de Kirchner; 10 December 2007 – 10 December 2015
- President: Cristina Fernández de Kirchner
- Vice President: Julio Cobos (2007–2011); Amado Boudou (2011–2015)
- Party: Justicialist Party; Front for Victory
- Election: 2007; 2011
- Seat: Casa Rosada
- Standard of the President

Cristina Fernández de Kirchner began her tenure as President of Argentina on 10 December 2007. Fernández de Kirchner, ideologically a Peronist, took office after winning the 2007 general election, succeeding her husband Néstor Kirchner, and secured a second term in 2011. She was the second female president of Argentina, after Isabel Perón served from 1973 to 1976. Her term expired on 10 December 2015, where she was succeeded by Mauricio Macri.

== Election to Presidency of Argentina ==
With Fernández de Kirchner leading all the pre-election polls by a wide margin, her challengers were trying to force her into a run-off. She needed either more than 45% of the vote, or 40% of the vote and a lead of more than 10% over her nearest rival, to win outright. Fernández de Kirchner won the election in the first round with 45.3% of the vote, followed by 22% for Elisa Carrió (candidate for the Civic Coalition) and 16% for former Economy Minister Roberto Lavagna. Eleven others split the remaining 15%. She was popular among the suburban working class and the rural poor, while Carrió received more support from the urban middle class, as did Lavagna. Of note, she lost the election in the three largest cities (Buenos Aires, Córdoba and Rosario), although she won in most other places elsewhere, including the large provincial capitals such as Mendoza and Tucumán.

On 14 November, the president-elect publicly announced the names of her new cabinet, which was sworn in on 10 December. Of the twelve ministers appointed, seven were already ministers in Néstor Kirchner's government, while the other five took office for the first time. Three other ministries were created afterwards.

The president elect began a four-year term on 10 December 2007, facing challenges including inflation, union demands for higher salaries, private investment in key areas, lack of institutional credibility (exemplified by the controversy surrounding the National Institute of Statistics and Census of Argentina, INDEC), utility companies demanding authorization to raise their fees, low availability of cheap credit to the private sector, and the upcoming negotiation of the defaulted foreign debt with the Paris Club. Fernández de Kirchner was the second female president of Argentina, after Isabel Perón, but unlike Perón, Fernández de Kirchner was the head of the ballot, whereas Isabel Perón was elected as vice president of Juan Perón and became president after his death. The transition from Néstor Kirchner to Cristina Fernández de Kirchner was also the first time when a democratic head of state was replaced by his spouse, without involving the death of any of them. Néstor Kirchner stayed active in politics despite not being the president, and worked alongside Cristina Kirchner. The press developed the term "presidential marriage" to make reference to both of them at once. Some political analysts compared this type of government with a diarchy.

== Presidency (2007–2015) ==
=== First Term ===
==== 2007 ====
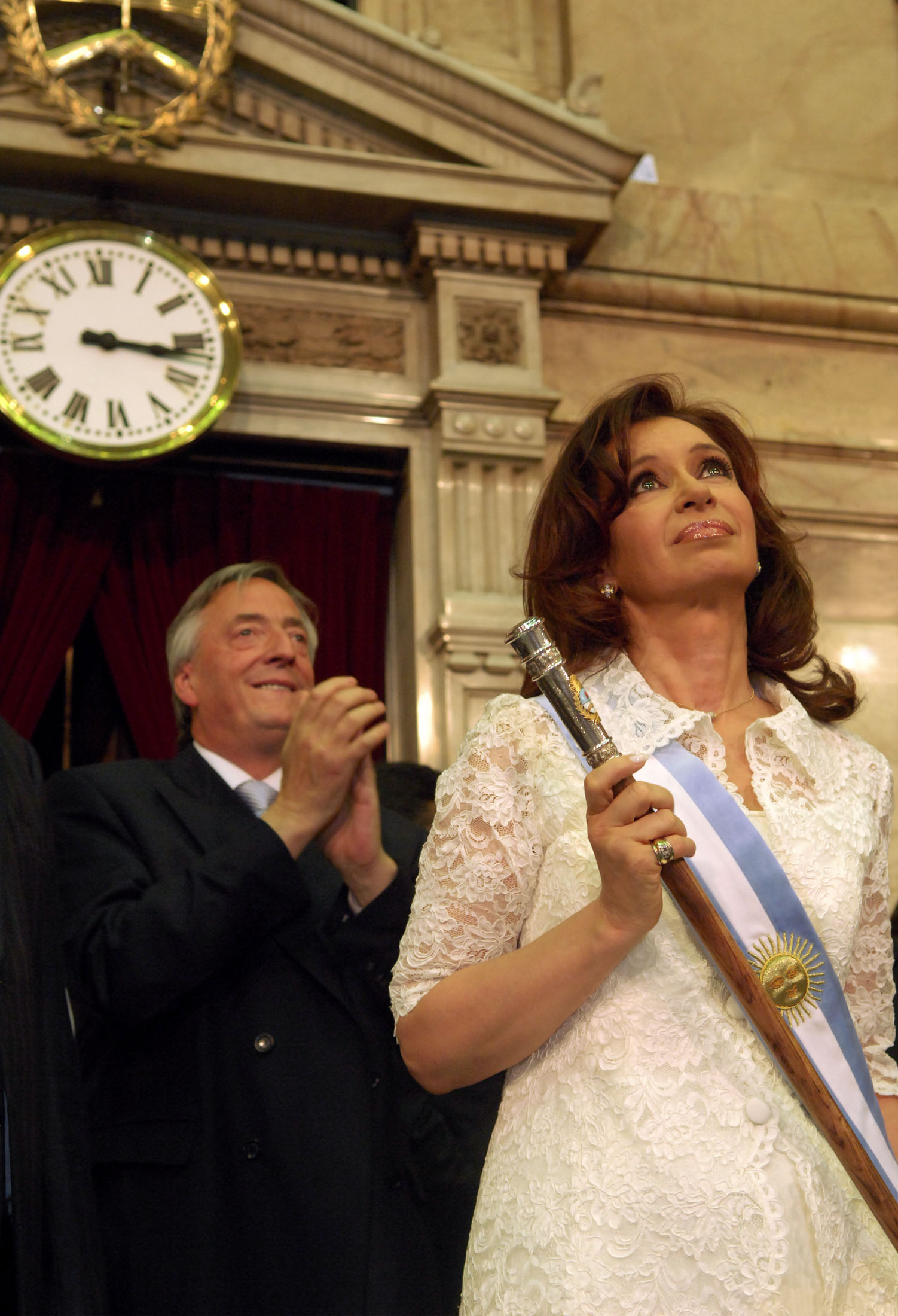
Fernández de Kirchner on her inauguration day

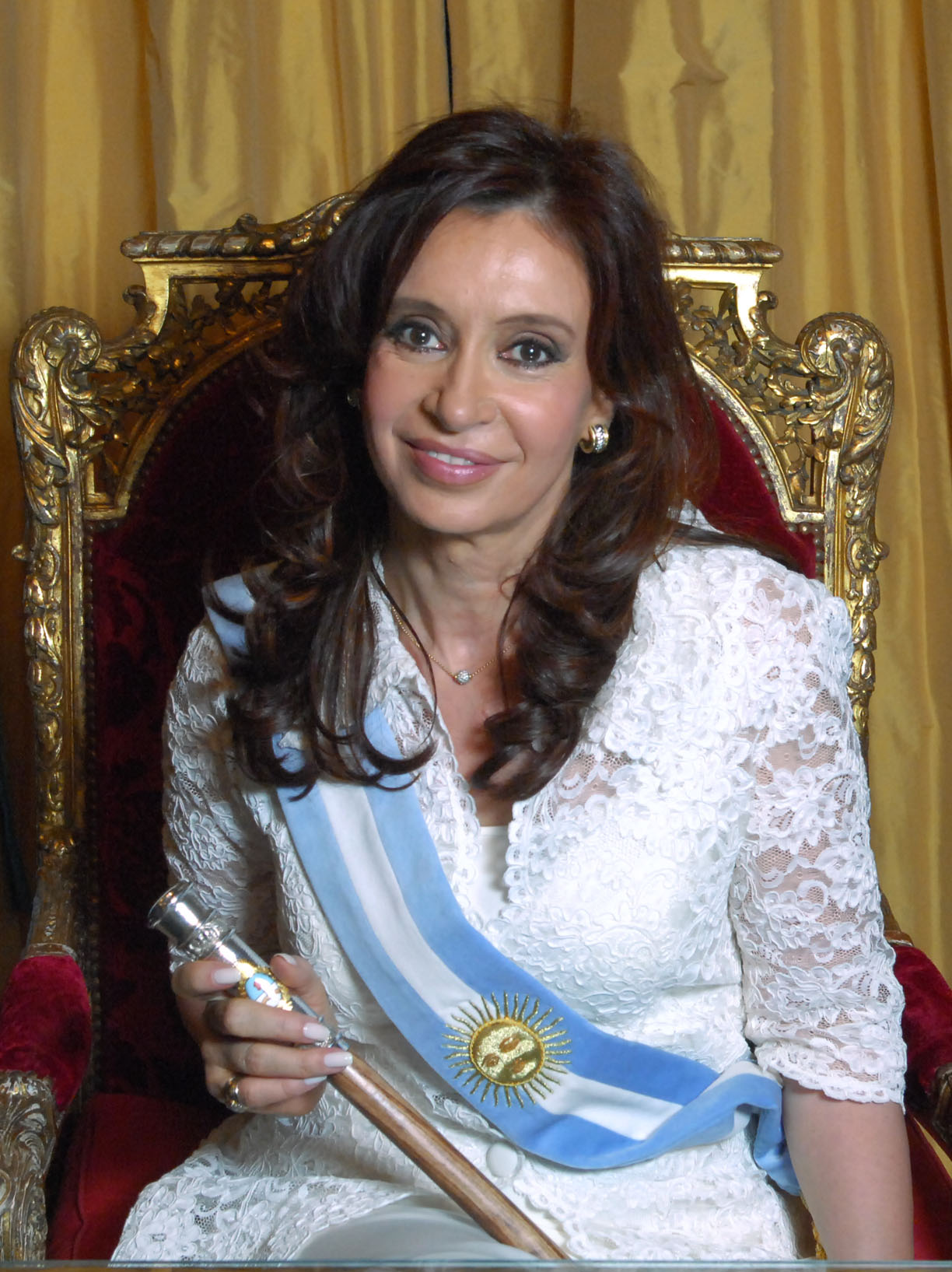
Official portrait, 2007

During the first days of Fernández de Kirchner's presidency, Argentina's relations with the United States deteriorated as a result of allegations made by a United States assistant attorney of illegal campaign contributions, a case known as the maletinazo, or "suitcase scandal". According to these allegations, Venezuelan agents tried to pressure a Venezuelan American citizen (Guido Antonini Wilson) to lie about the origin of $790,550 in cash found in his suitcase on 4 August 2007 at a Buenos Aires airport. U.S. prosecutors allege the money was sent to help Fernández de Kirchner's presidential campaign. Some of the allegations were proven and several individuals received a prison sentence after a widely reported trial.

Fernández de Kirchner and Venezuelan president Hugo Chávez called the allegations "a trashing operation" and part of a conspiracy orchestrated by the U.S. to divide Latin American nations. On 19 December 2007, she restricted the U.S. ambassador's activities and limited his meetings to Foreign Ministry officials; a treatment reserved for hostile countries, in the opinion of a former U.S. Assistant Secretary of State. However, on 31 January, in a special meeting with Fernández de Kirchner, the U.S. Ambassador to Argentina, Earl Anthony Wayne, clarified that the allegations "were never made by the United States government," and the dispute cooled down. Having said that the prosecutors making the charges are part of the independent judicial branch of the U.S. government

Presidential styles of Cristina Fernández de Kirchner
- Reference style: Su Excelencia Señora Presidente de la Nación Argentina "Her Excellency Madam President of the Argentine Nation"
- Spoken style: Presidente de la Nación "President of the Nation"
- Alternative style: Señora Presidente "Madam President"

Elisa Carrió and María Estenssoro, both high-ranking members of the main opposition parties, have claimed that the Argentine government's response to the allegations and its criticism of the U.S. are a "smokescreen", that the U.S. involvement in the affair was merely symptomatic, and the root cause of the scandal is corruption in the Argentine and Venezuelan governments.

==== 2008 ====
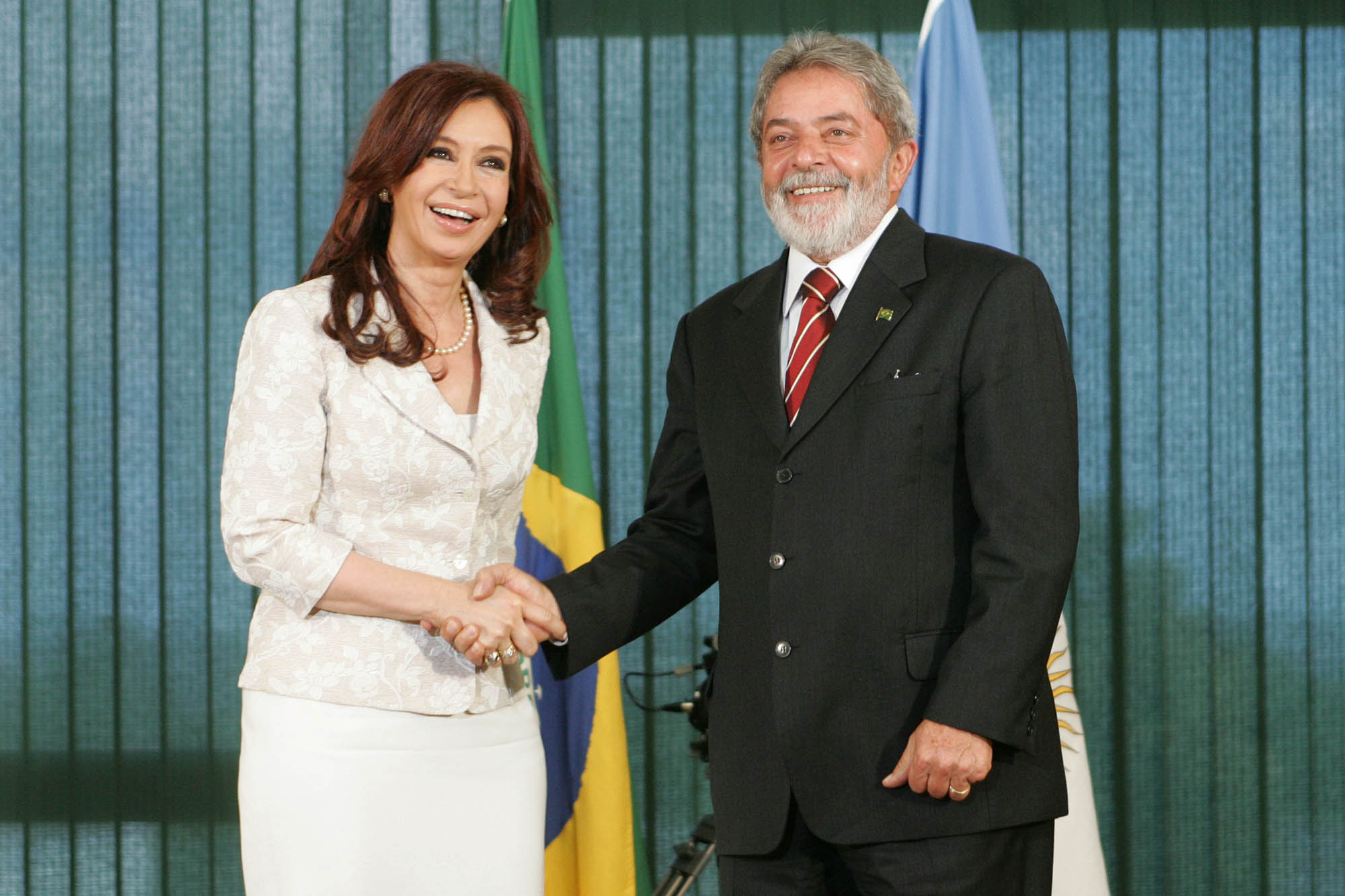
Fernández de Kirchner with current Brazilian president Lula

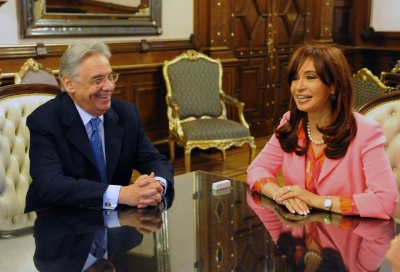
Fernández de Kirchner with former Brazilian president, Fernando Henrique Cardoso

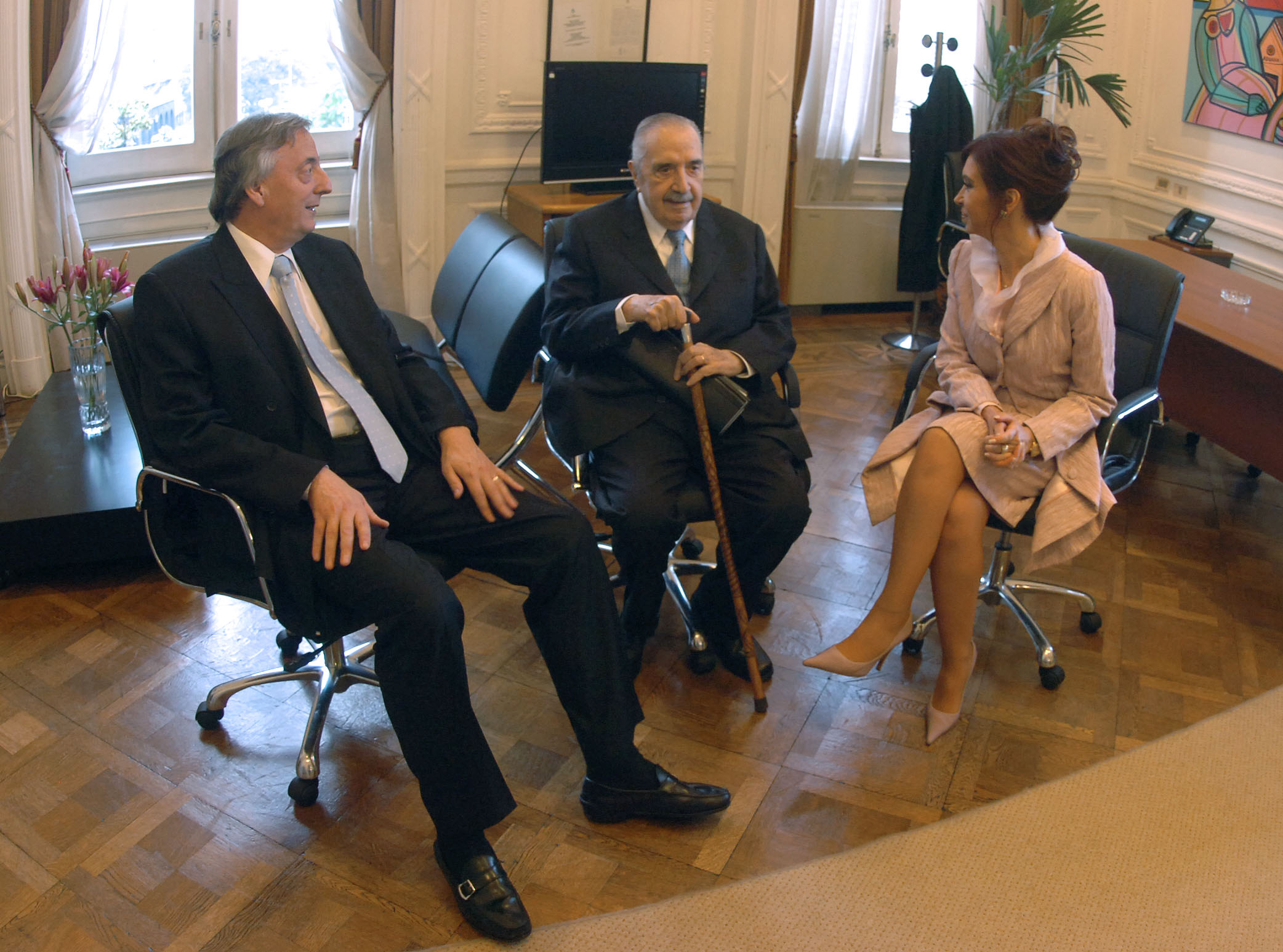
Fernández de Kirchner (right) with former Argentine presidents Néstor Kirchner (left) and Raúl Alfonsín (center) in 2008

Riding a wave of approval during a dramatic economic recovery from a 2001-02 crisis, the Kirchners' FPV had prevailed enjoyed increasingly large majorities in Congress, reaching their peak following the 2007 general elections (with 153 Congressmen and 44 Senators, at the time). In March 2008, Kirchner introduced a new sliding-scale taxation system for agricultural exports, effectively raising levies on soybean exports from 35% to 44% at the time of the announcement. This led to a nationwide lockout by farming associations, starting on 12 March, with the aim of forcing the government to back down on the new taxation scheme. They were joined on 25 March by thousands of pot-banging demonstrators massed around the Buenos Aires Obelisk and in front of the presidential palace.

Protests extended across the country. In Buenos Aires, hours after Kirchner attacked farmers for their two-week strike and "abundant" profits, there were violent incidents between government supporters and opponents, to which the police was accused of wilfully turning a blind eye. The media was harshly critical of Luis D'Elía, a former government official who took part in the incidents, with some media sources and members of the opposition (notably Elisa Carrió), claiming that he and his followers had disrupted the protest pursuant to the government's orders. On 1 April, the government organised a rally during which thousands of pro-government protesters marched through downtown Buenos Aires in support of the bill increasing Argentina's export taxes on the basis of a sliding scale; at the event, Kirchner called on farmers to act "as part of a country, not as owners of a country."

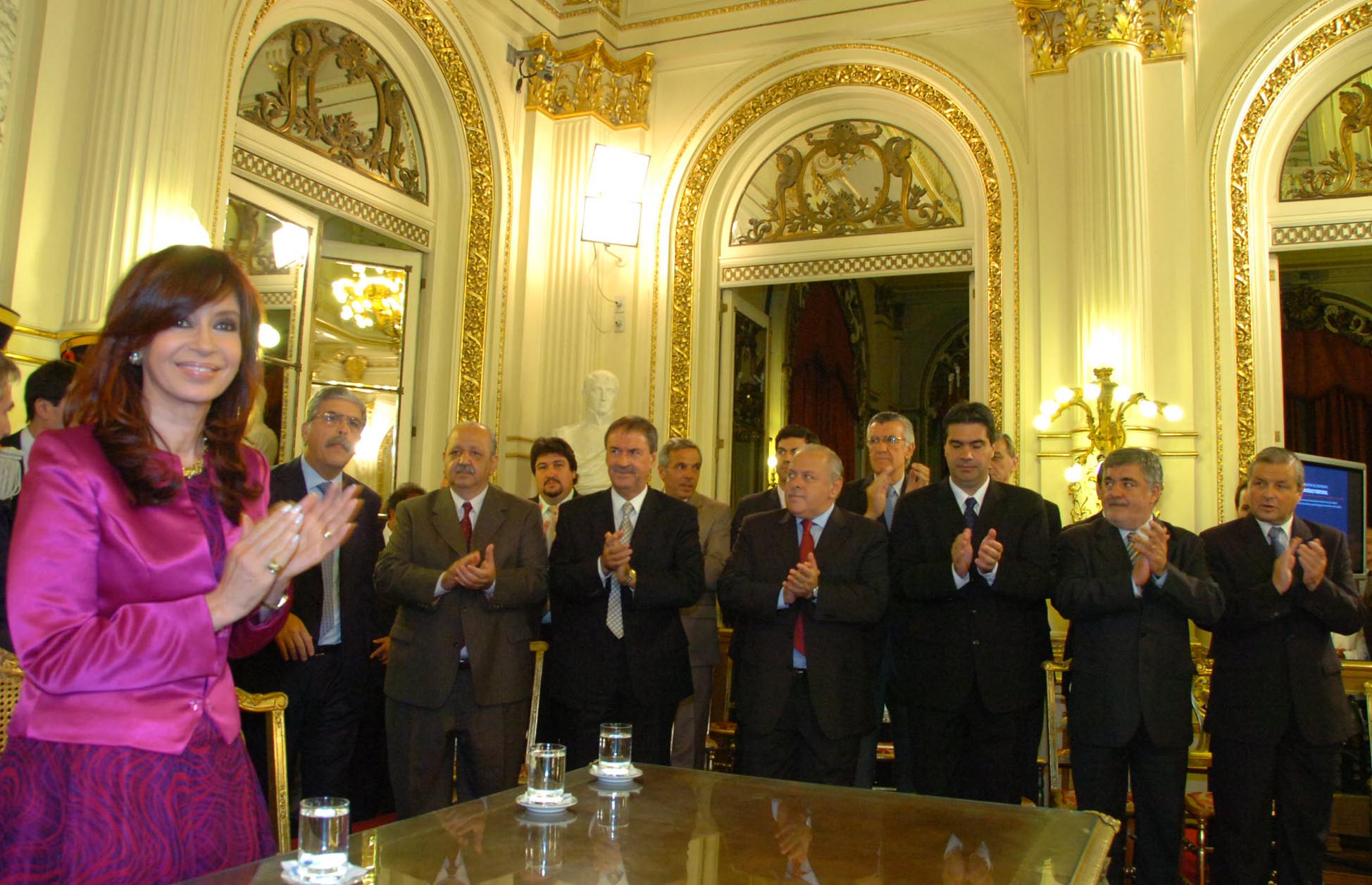
The President in a meeting with the nation's governors

In April 2008, on the 26th anniversary of the Falklands War, Kirchner stepped up Argentine claims to the Falkland Islands. She called Argentina's rights to the islands "inalienable".

"With faith in God, and with the work that we all have to do to build a country that is strong and respected around the world, so that our voice is heard in all International forums, and we can denounce the shameful presence of a colonial enclave in the 21st century".

The large majorities in the Argentine Congress enjoyed by the Front for Victory could not ultimately guarantee a legislative blank check: on 16 July 2008, the presidentially sponsored bill met with deadlock, and was ultimately defeated by the tie-breaking "no" vote of vice president Julio Cobos himself. The controversy cost the FPV 16 Congressmen and 4 Senators by way of defections. This put an end to the 2008 Argentine government conflict with the agricultural sector, though it cost Cobos access to the executive branch of the government. He was reportedly considered "a traitor" by the followers of Kirchner's administration. Cobos denied that he would resign, although the relationship between the president and the vice president has an uncertain future.

A poll result published in El País, Spain's most widely circulated daily newspaper, revealed that following the protests, Fernández's approval rating had "plummeted" from 57.8% at the start of her administration to an unprecedented 23%. Once recovered from the conflict with agrarian interests, Cristina Kirchner's public approval improved; her job approval ratings rose by 30% (Poliarquía, 08/22/08). Her inflexible handling of the protests and reluctance to review the policies that sparked the protest have led to speculation that it was her husband Néstor Kirchner who controlled her administration. The British weekly newspaper The Economist has described this situation as Kirchner "paying the price for her husband's pig-headedness", and as of February 2009, her job approval rating was 28%.

On 20 October 2008, Fernández de Kirchner proposed the transfer of nearly US$30 billion in private pension holdings to the social security system, a law that was passed by Congress in late November.

Kirchner is a member of the Council of Women World Leaders, an international network of current and former women presidents and prime ministers whose mission is to mobilize the highest-level women leaders globally for collective action on issues of critical importance to women and equitable development.

Fernández was invited to the Summit on Financial Markets and the World Economy in Washington, D.C., on 15 November 2008, by U.S. president George W. Bush. During her stay in Washington, she held meetings with Brazilian leader Luiz Inácio Lula da Silva (at the Four Seasons Hotel in Georgetown), Madeleine Albright (representing U.S. president-elect Barack Obama), Senator Christopher Dodd and Australia's Prime Minister, Kevin Rudd at the Park Hyatt Hotel. She then attended the G20 meeting in London 2 April 2009 and was given a seat of honour at the dinner held the night before at 10 Downing Street, when she was seated across from president Obama.

Also in the year 2008, Cristina Kirchner vetoed the "Law of protection of the glaciers" ( Spanish: ley de protección de los glaciares ), which had been approved almost unanimously in Congress (only 3 senators opposed the law). Critics have stated that the president's attitude would threaten over 75% of the country's water reserves.

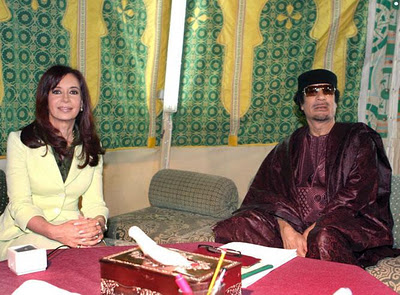
Kirchner meet with Libyan Leader Muammar Gaddafi in Tripoli, Libya in 2008

Cristina Kirchner travelled extensively as president, visiting Algeria, Brazil, Cuba, Egypt, France, Libya, Mexico, Qatar, Russia, Spain, the UK, the U.S. and Venezuela, among other nations.

==== 2009 ====
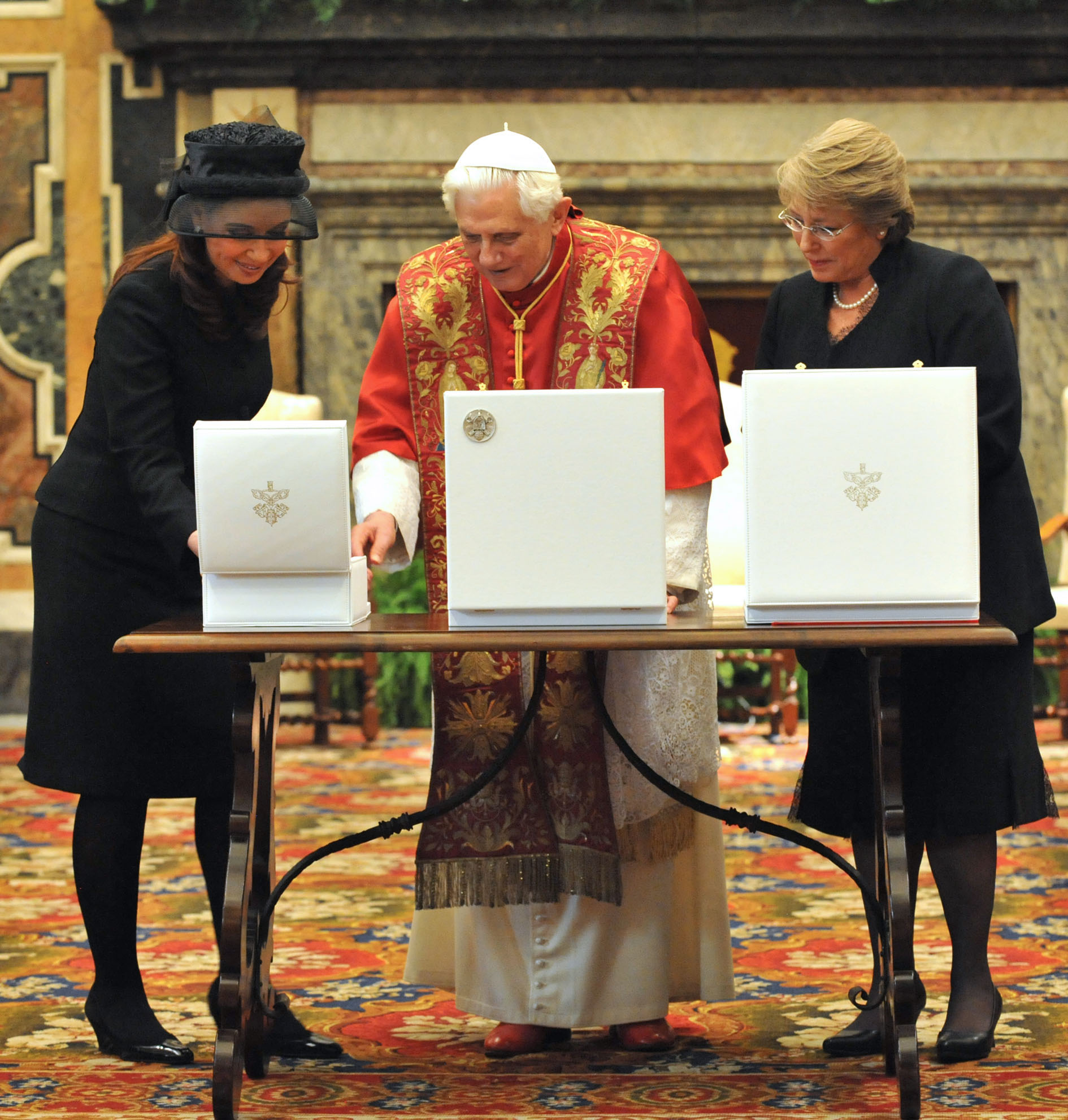
Fernández de Kirchner (left) with Chilean President, Michelle Bachelet (right) and Pope Benedict XVI (center) commemorating Argentina and Chile friendship

Following the 28 June 2009, mid-term elections, the ruling FPV's party list lost its absolute majority in both houses of Congress, shedding a further 24 seats in the Lower House (including allies) and 4 in the Senate. They lost in the four most important electoral districts (home to 60% of Argentines), and among these, the loss was narrow only in the Province of Buenos Aires. The FPV obtained a very narrow victory, overall, as a percentage of the national vote, and retained their plurality in Congress. This will be reflected in strengthened opposition alliances, notably the center-right Unión Pro, the centrist Civic Coalition and the left-wing Proyecto Sur, when elected candidates in both chambers take office on 11 December 2009.

Allegations of impropriety have contributed increasingly to the Kirchners' decline in approval, as well. The couple's own, latest federal financial disclosure in July 2009 revealed an increase in their personal assets by 7 times, since Néstor Kirchner's 2003 inaugural. The increase was partly the product of land deals in El Calafate, a scenic, Santa Cruz Province town where the couple has long vacationed and own property (including 450 acres (1.8 km^{2}) of land and two hotels).

On 17 October 2009, Kirchner proposed the compulsory submission of DNA samples in cases related to crimes against humanity, in a move lauded by the Grandmothers of the Plaza de Mayo, but excoriated by opposition figures as a political move against Clarín Media Group Chairperson Ernestina Herrera de Noble, who is in litigation over her suspected adoption of two children of the "disappeared," and whose hitherto cordial relations with Kirchnerism had recently soured. Similar motives are alleged by the opposition against the president's Media Law, which would restrict the number of media licences per proprietor and allocate a greater share of these to state and NGOs, thereby limiting the influence of Clarín and the conservative La Nación. The president's proposed enactment of mandatory primary elections for all of Argentina's myriad political parties, and for every elected post, was likewise rejected by opposition figures, who charged that these reforms could stymy minor parties and the formation of new ones.

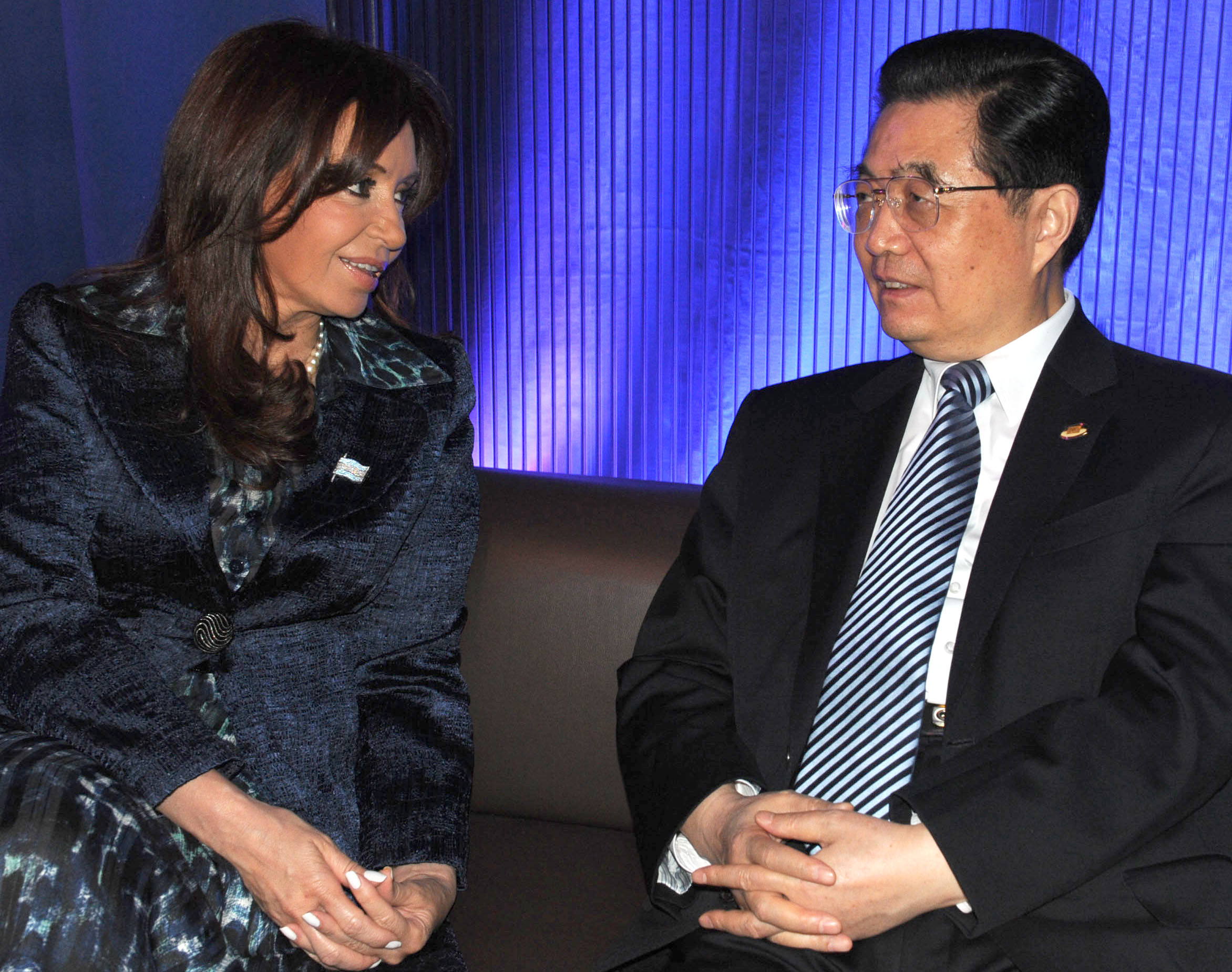
Fernández de Kirchner with Chinese president, Hu Jintao in 2010

Following charges of embezzlement filed by a local attorney, Enrique Piragini, on 29 October, Federal Judge Norberto Oyarbide ordered an accounting expert to investigate the origin of the Kirchners’ wealth. Public records show that since their arrival to power in 2003, the declared assets of Cristina and Néstor Kirchner have increased by 572%. A preliminary report on the investigation by the Argentine Anti Corruption Office (OA) established that the official figures provided by the Kirchners "don't stack up". The investigation was suspended by Judge Oyarbide on 30 December, though a week later, Piragini appealed the ruling.

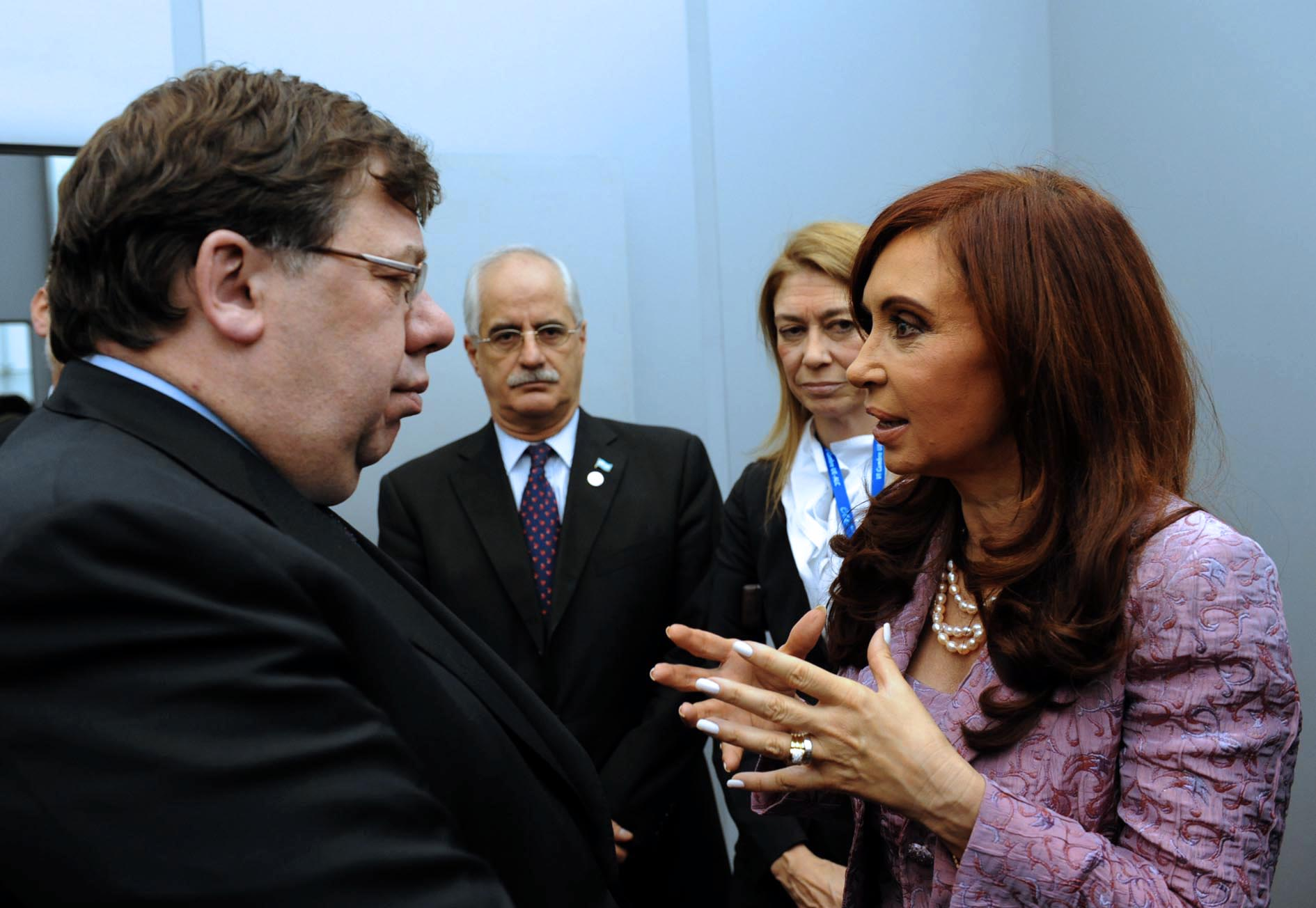
President Cristina Fernández de Kirchner with Irish prime minister Brian Cowen

On 29 October 2009 she launched a universal child benefit plan ( Spanish: Asignación Universal por Hijo ) as a way to fight poverty with the goal to reach approximately five million children and youths.

==== 2010 ====
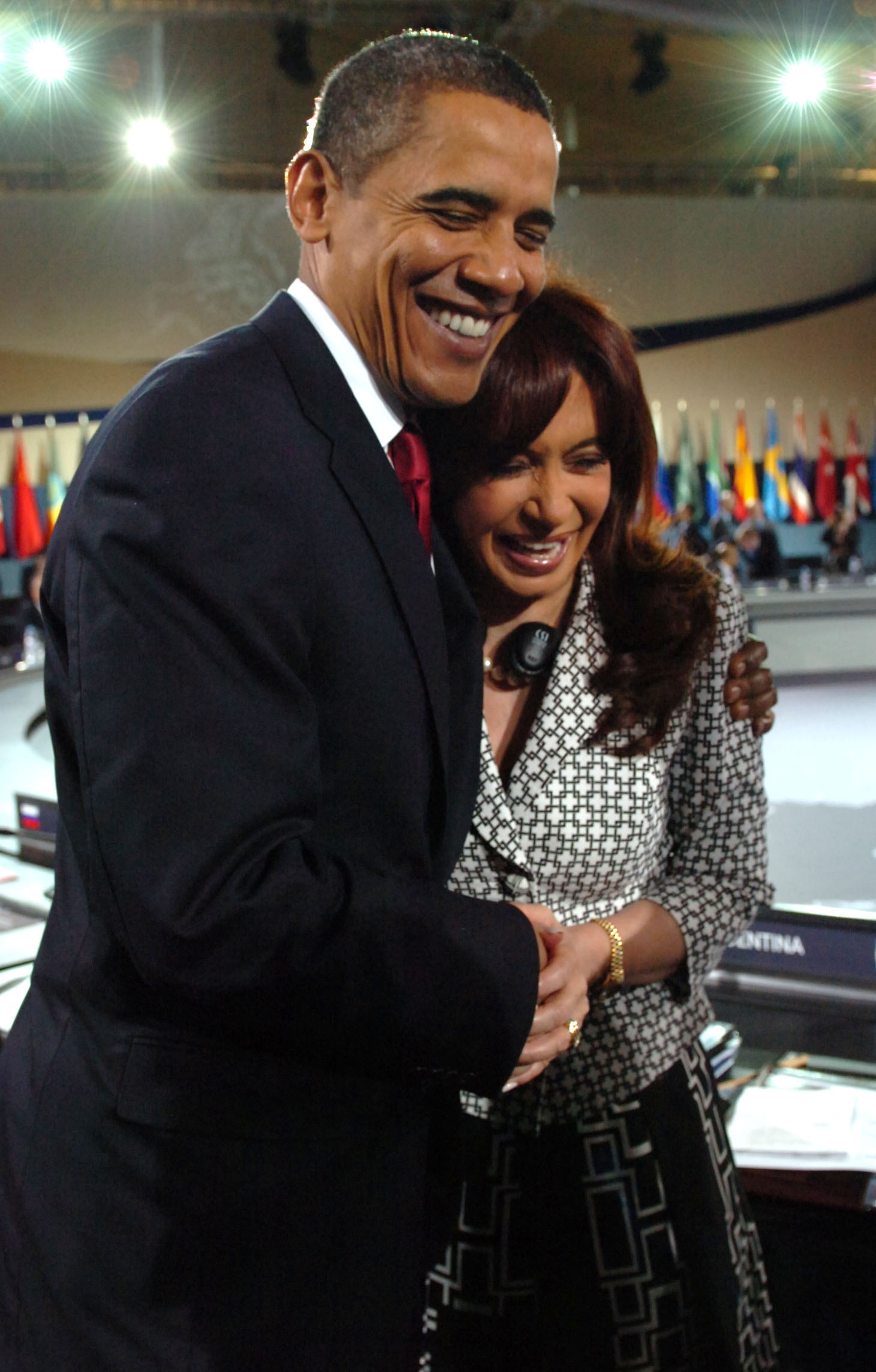
Fernández with U.S. president Barack Obama, 2009

The year began with controversy surrounding the president's order that a US$6.7 billion escrow account be opened at the Central Bank for the purpose of retiring high-interest bonds, whose principal is tied to inflation. The move met with the opposition of Central Bank president Martín Redrado, who refused to implement it, and following an impasse, he was dismissed by presidential decree on 7 January 2010.

Redrado refused to abide by the initial decree removing him from the presidency of the Central Bank, however, and petitioned for a judicial power to keep him in office. Accordingly, the president enacted another decree for his dismissal, citing "mis-conduct" on Redrado's part. The legitimacy of this new decree was questioned as well, as his dismissal would deny Redrado due process. Congress was at a recess period at the time, but most of its opposition members considered returning to override the decrees through an extraordinary session. The session became a source of controversy as well: Kirchner considered that, according to the 63rd article of the Constitution, only the president may call for an extraordinary session while the Congress is in recess. Cobos replied instead that all regulations concerning decrees require the immediate advise and consent of Congress, that the body's by-laws (56 and 57) allow extraordinary sessions called by any member, and that the commission formed for that purpose functions all at all times, even during recess.

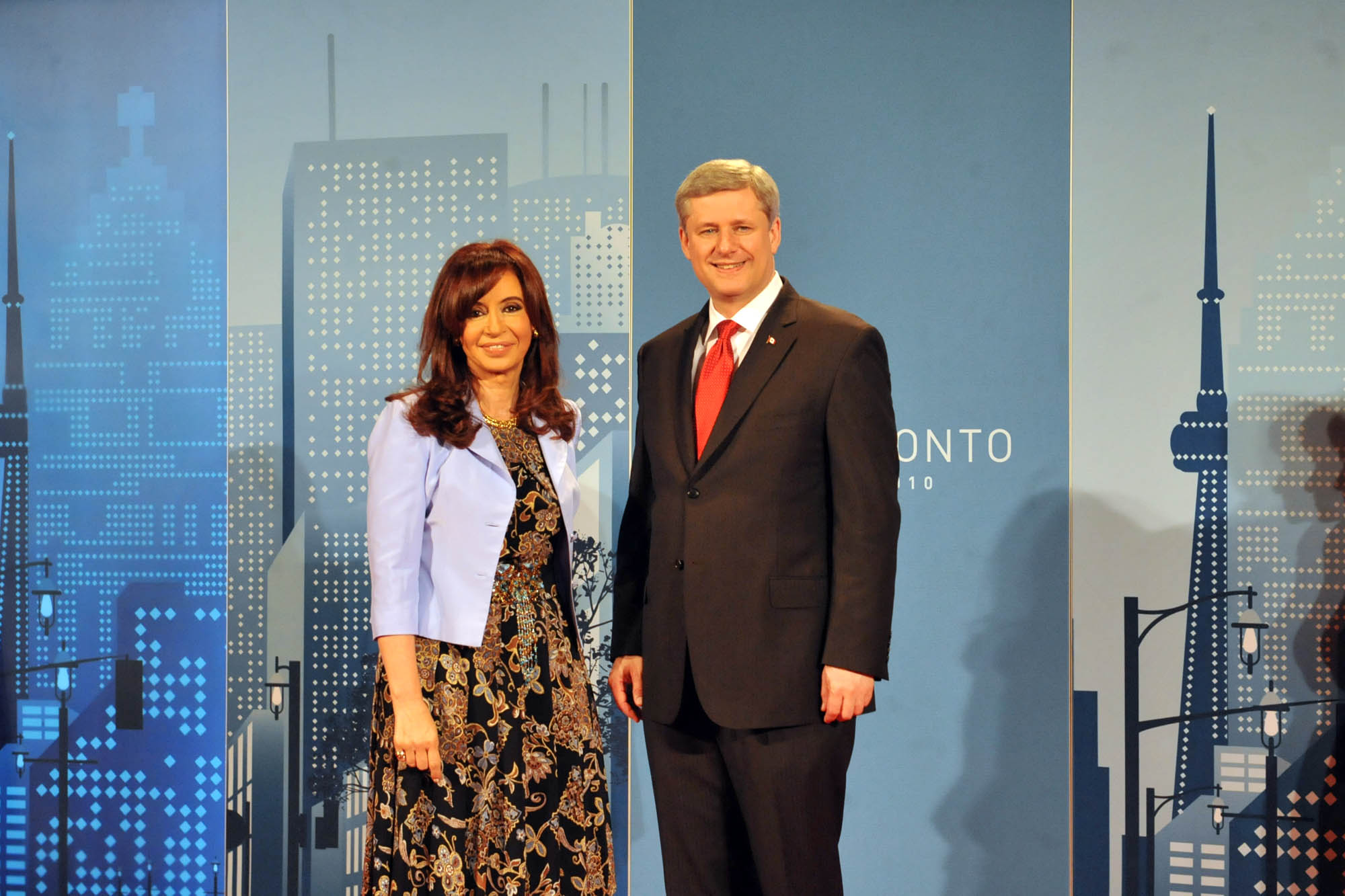
Fernández de Kirchner with Canadian prime minister, Stephen Harper in 2010

The planned use of foreign exchange reserves through a Necessity and Urgency Decree was itself questioned by several opposition figures, who argued that such a decree may not meet a threshold of "necessity" and "urgency" required by the Constitution of Argentina for its enactment. Judge María José Sarmiento handed down a ruling preventing said use of reserves, and the Government reacted by appealing the ruling. Kirchner defended the policy as a cost saving maneuver, whereby government bonds paying out 15 percent interest would be retired from the market. The move, however, also provided numerous vulture funds (holdouts from the 2005 debt restructuring who had resorted to the courts in a bid for higher returns on their defaulted bonds) a legal argument against the central bank's autarky, and thus facilitated a judgement lien on 12 January against a central bank account in New York.

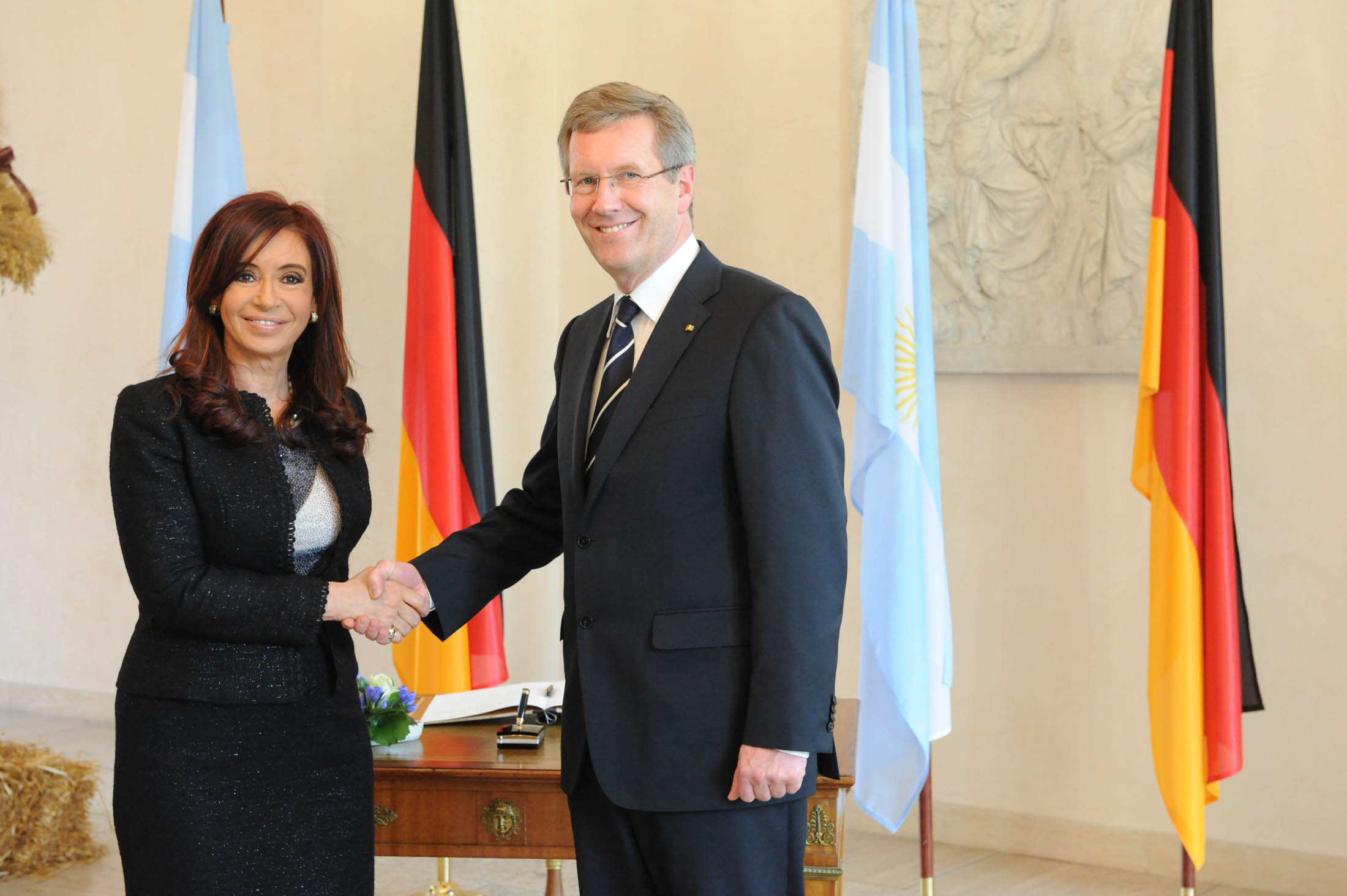
Fernández de Kirchner with German president, Christian Wulff

Judge Sarmiento also annulled the decree that removed Redrado and reinstated him as president of the Central Bank the following day. The ruling also refuted claims of mis-conduct cited by Kirchner to justify his removal. International media described the attempted removal of Redrado as authoritarian, while criticizing the planned use of reserves for debt retirement, as well as accelerating spending growth, as fiscally irresponsible. Opposition Congresswoman Elisa Carrió, a likely candidate in the upcoming 2011 presidential campaign, has raised the possibility of impeachment procedures against Mrs. Kirchner.

Cristina Fernández and her husband Néstor were in January 2010 reported to the Judiciary because of "illicit gain". It was reported that their personal fortune grew surprisingly too much from the period of 2007 to 2008. This incident came on the heels of the issues with the Central Bank and Martín Redrado.

At the start of the month of February 2010, one of Kirchner's private assessors resigned his post due to the claims of "illicit gain". Just two weeks afterwards, another of her private asesors, Julio Daniel Álvarez, resigned for the same reason.

On 22 February 2010, British oil explorer Desire Petroleum, started drilling exploration wells some 60 miles (97 km) north of the disputed Falkland/Malvinas Islands, despite strong opposition from Argentina which took the issue to the Latin America and Caribbean presidents summit where it received unanimous support. According to geological surveys carried out in 1998, there could be 60 billion barrels (9.5×10^{9} m^{3}) of oil in the area around the islands but the 2010 drill carried out poor results. As a result, Desire's share price plummeted and the company announced further work could begin later this year (2010).

In March 2010 Fernández made an historic amends trip to Peru a country with whom relations had been adversely affected following the Carlos Menem administration's illegal sale of weapons to Ecuador in the 1990s. In the same month Fernández received the visit of Secretary of State Hillary Clinton in Buenos Aires, where she received great support for the way her administration was managing the foreign debt issue and emphasized the positive relationship between the two countries something which was not reported by local major news media

==== With President of Russia Dmitry Medvedev in April 2010 ====
In April 2010, Chile's new president Sebastián Piñera was received in Buenos Aires on his first foreign tour abroad and reaffirmed the current strong ties between the two countries. following which Cristina Fernández attended the Nuclear Security Summit in Washington DC, after which Barack Obama thanked Argentina for its role in international stabilization and earthquake relief efforts in Haiti. Back in Buenos Aires, she received the Russian president Dmitry Medvedev the first such visit in Argentina's history. Two days later, the Prime Minister of Vietnam Nguyễn Tấn Dũng arrived. On 19 April, she was invited to the bicentennary of the independence celebrations in Venezuela, where she was the main speaker in front of the National Assembly. She signed 25 trade agreements with Venezuela relating to food, technology and energy.

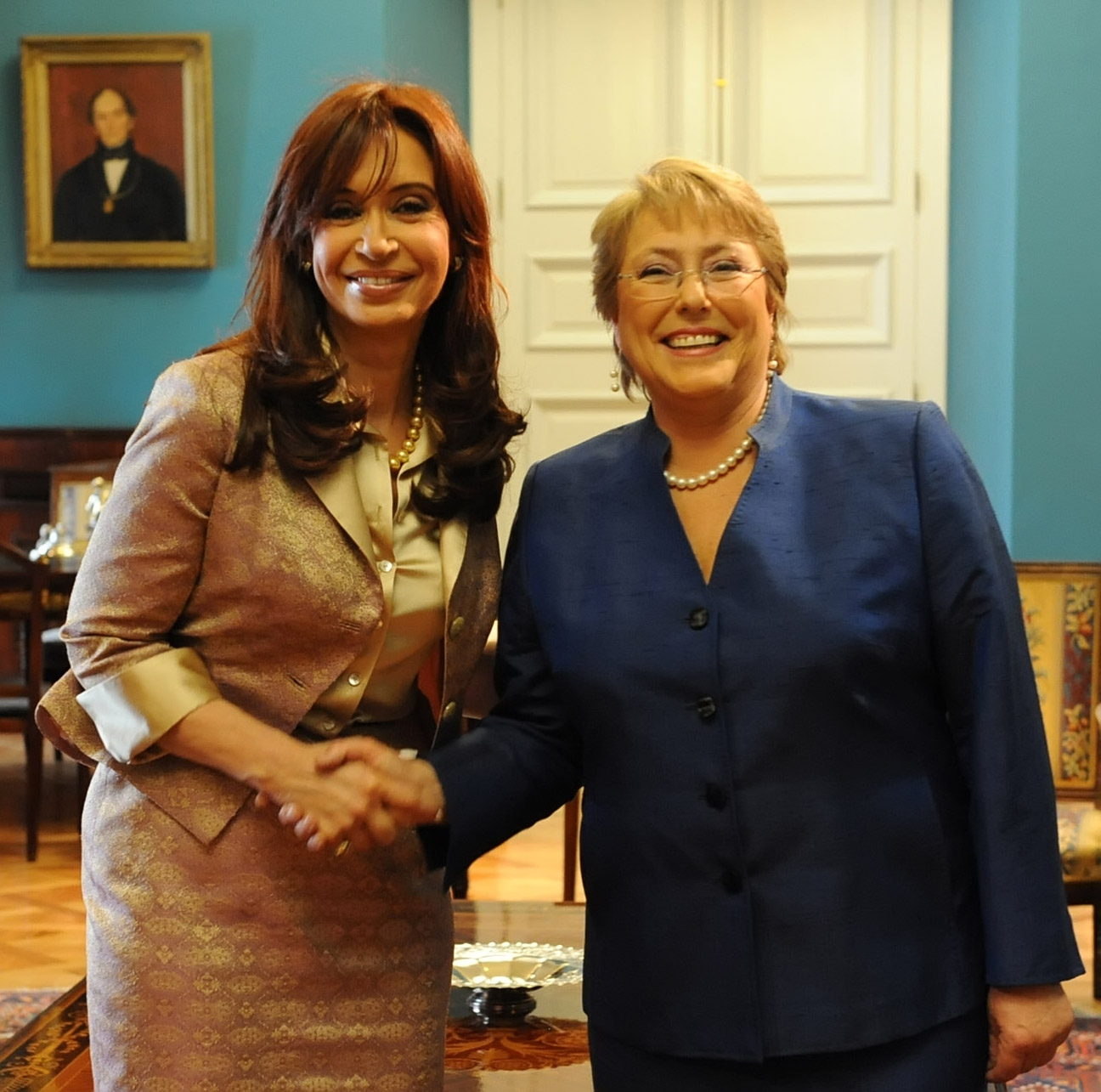
Fernández de Kirchner with Chilean president Michelle Bachelet

In May 2010, Kirchner travelled to Spain for the European Union-Latin America and the Caribbean summit, where she was asked to compare the euro area crisis and the 2001 Argentine's default. Back in Buenos Aires, during the Argentina Bicentennial celebrations, Cristina Fernández did not participate in the military parade of 5,000 troops (which included delegations of Brazil, Chile, Uruguay, Bolivia, etc.) on the 9 de Julio Avenue, which was considered a gest of contempt towards the Argentine Armed Forces.

In June 2010, her administration completed the debt swap (which was started by former president Néstor Kirchner in 2005) clearing 92% of the bad debt left from its sovereign default in 2001. Argentina external debt now represents 30% of the country's GDP, whilst the Central Bank foreign reserves reached $49 billion {USD}, more than the amount that was available when the decision to pay foreign debt earlier in the year was taken.

Also in June 2010, she gave a speech at the International Trade Union Confederation (CSI) Global Summit, being held in Vancouver, Canada where she asserted that "many Euro-zone countries today have applied the same policies that led Argentina to disaster (in 2001)," stating, also, that "it's an inescapable responsibility of the government to intervene in the financial system.". Later, she traveled to Toronto to attend the G20 Summit and spoke against the EU fiscal austerity plans fearing this would lead to a slow down in the global economy. French president Nicolas Sarkozy responded by saying that the Latin American representatives who reject the Eurozone adjustments do not know the harassment to the Euro, to which Cristina Fernández responded that he shouldn't "question somebody" just because he doesn't "agree" with what they say and also clarified that Argentina is interested in the euro because parts of its reserves are held in euros and that she's "sure that Sarkozy does not have even one cent in Argentine pesos in his Central Bank.". Later addressing the press she added, "In Latin America we can give cathedra about harassment and seizure." She also had a chance to speak with new British Prime Minister David Cameron.

In July 2010, she traveled to China with the goal of, according to the Chinese embassy at Buenos Aires, strengthening the strategic partnership between the two countries On her return, she signed a bill legalizing same-sex marriage in Argentina. This strained the government's already strained relationship with the Catholic Church. She also reaffirmed her policy of debt reduction in announcing to continue to pay foreign debt with Central Bank foreign reserves which reached a country historic record of US$51 billion in July.

In August 2010, Cristina Fernández began to use her Twitter account (under the handle "CFKArgentina"). She also preceded the 39th Mercosur summit at San Juan where the trade bloc agrees to reduce customs fees and signs a free-trade deal with Egypt

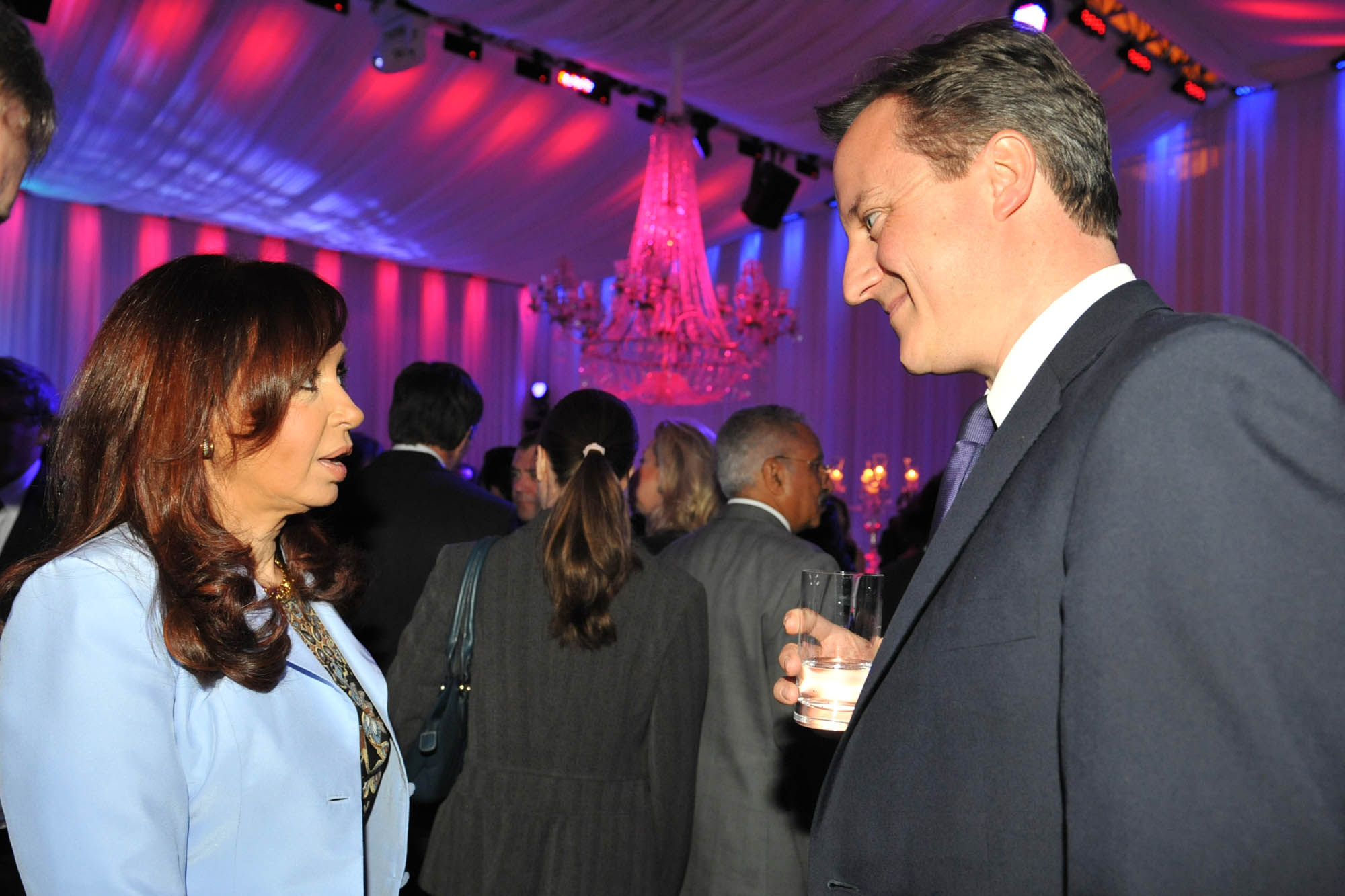
Fernández de Kirchner with British prime minister David Cameron

In September 2010, it was announced that Argentina was elected president of the Group of 77 + China and prepared to act as a ‘bridge" with G-20 major economies to which it also belongs. She visited Chile during their Bicentenary celebrations where she also assisted at the baptism of a Chilean baby, Anaís Escobar Maldonado, born in the Argentine Hospital deployed at Curico after the earthquake. The visit had a high profile in the media mainly because of the possible extradition to Chile of Sergio Apablaza. She met with president Sebastián Piñera and participated in the festivities at the national stadium. She also confirmed the celebration of the III bi-national cabinet meeting for next October. Fernández de Kirchner then departed for New York to give her United Nations General Assembly speech where she once again criticized Britain over the Falklands (Malvinas) issue, and Iran for the 1994 AMIA bombing whilst giving her support for an Israeli-Palestinian dialogue and an eventual Palestinian state. On 30 September she hosted the UNASUR presidents' emergency summit at Buenos Aires due to the Ecuador crisis and started an official visit to Germany the following day in order to participate as a Guest of Honour at the Frankfurt Book Fair and meet with Chancellor Angela Merkel. In October she inaugurates the III News Agencies World Congress to be held in Bariloche. This same month, and as part of the 2006 civilian nuclear-power reactivation program, Fernández reopened the Pilcaniyeu uranium enrichment plant, put on ice in the 1990s, amid worsening shortages of natural gas. Following the death of her spouse (see below), she also resumed activities and flew to South Korea for the G20 Seoul summit. After her return she announces that the Paris Club agrees to debt talks without the International Monetary Fund intervention as proposed by Argentina since 2008. These negotiations will result in the settlement of the last portion of the sovereign debt defaulted in the 2001 crisis after the successful restructuring debts of 2005 and 2009. In November she also participated in the UNASUR Summit at Guyana after which will host the XX Ibero-American Summit at Mar del Plata.

==== Death of Néstor Kirchner ====
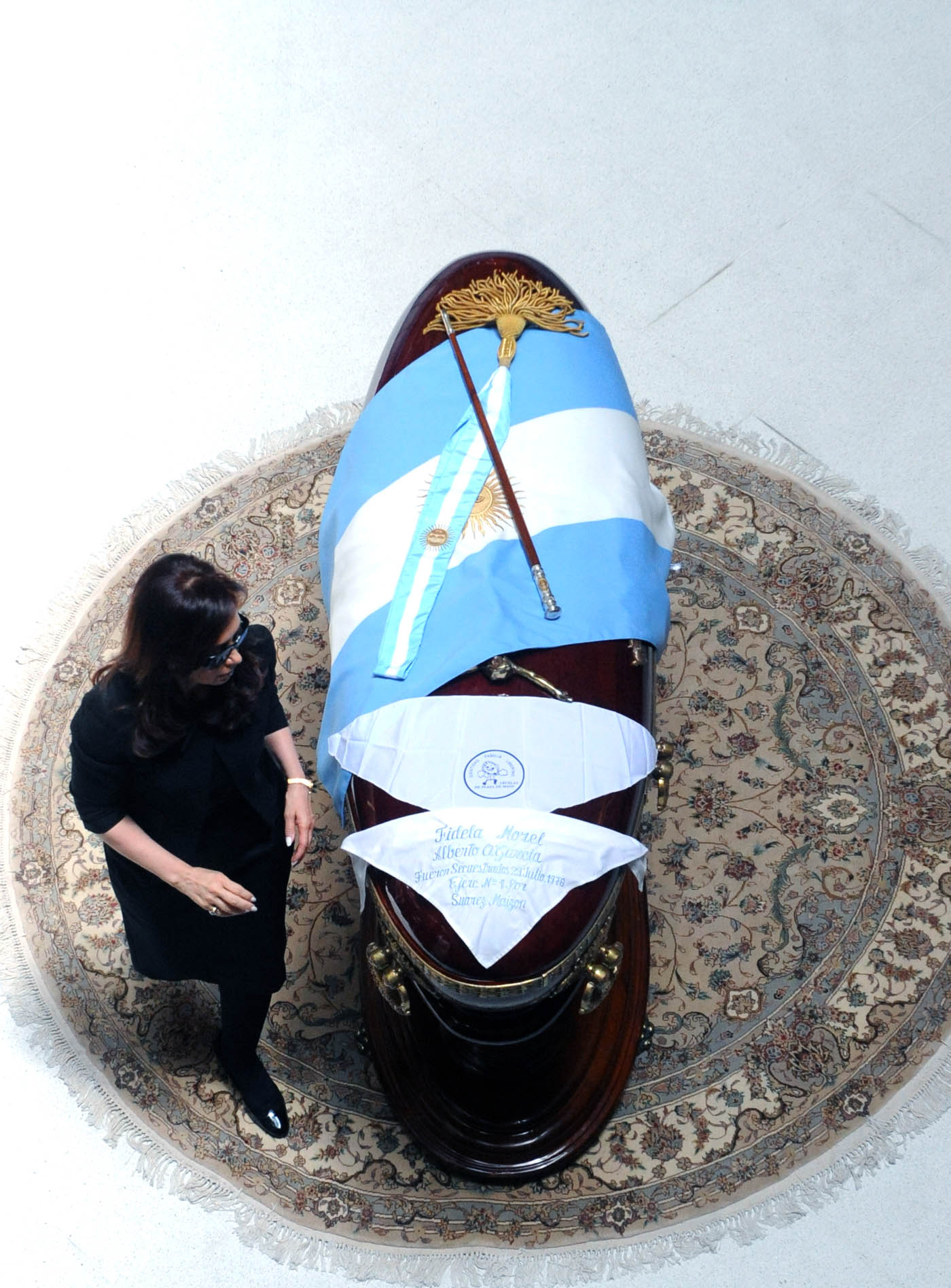
Fernández de Kirchner passing by her husband's flag-draped coffin, lying in state

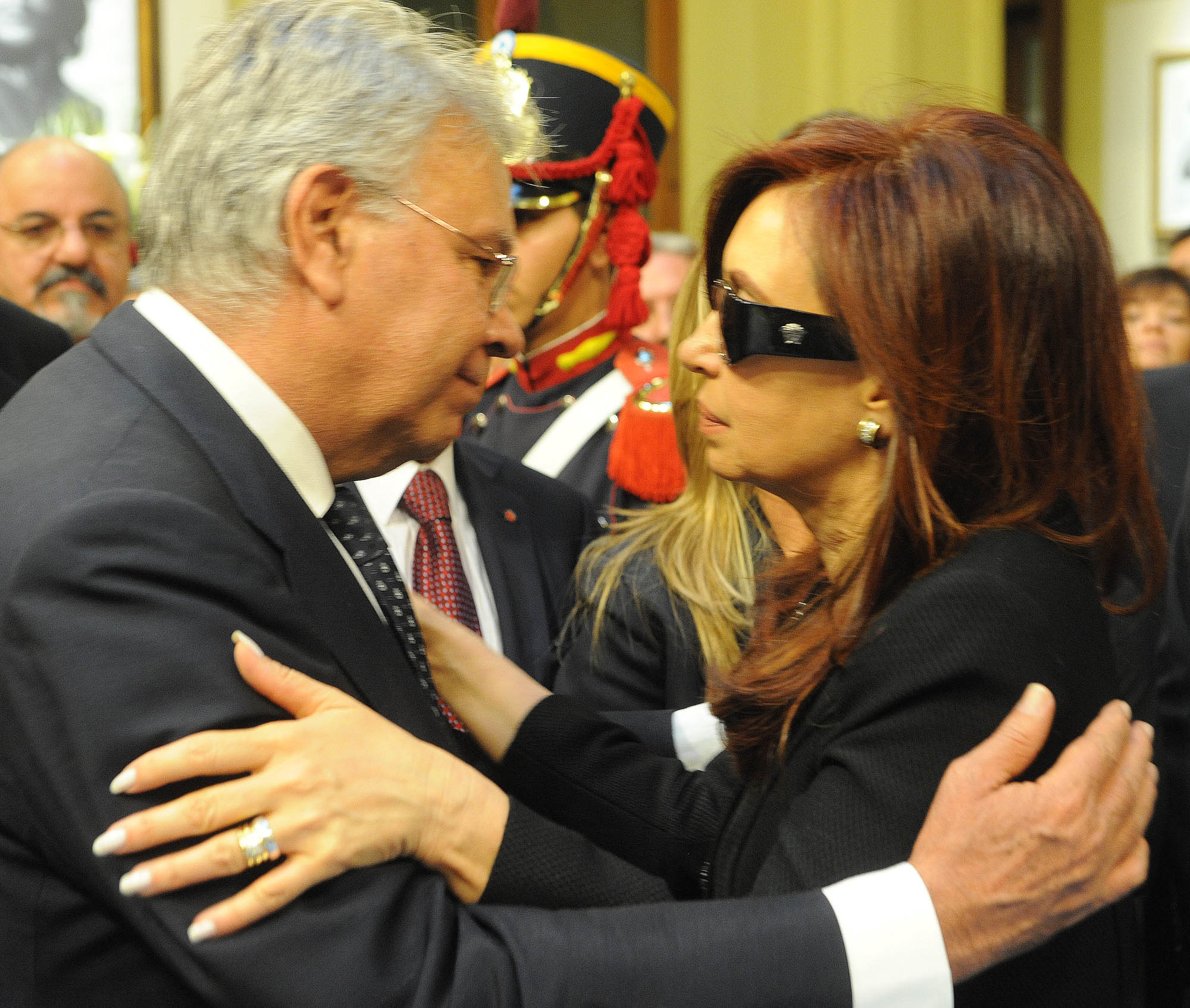
Fernández de Kirchner with former Spanish prime minister Felipe Gonzalez, during the state funeral of Néstor Kirchner in 2010

On the morning of 27 October 2010, her husband, former president Néstor Kirchner, died of a heart failure at the Hospital Jose Formenti in El Calafate, Santa Cruz Province. He had been subject to two coronary interventions earlier in the year (2010). On 7 February 2010, he developed problems with the common carotid artery and needed surgery. On 11 September, he was intervened because of coronary artery blockage and needed an angioplasty.

==== 2011 ====
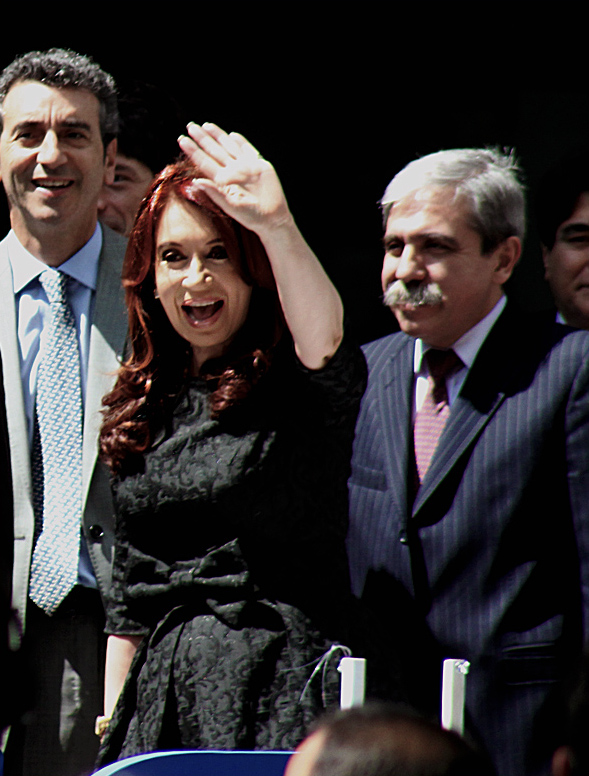
Kirchner on election night.

The 2011 year was influenced by the general election in October. The youth organization Cámpora increased its influence in the government, disputing offices and candidacies with the traditional hierarchies of the Justicialist Party and the CGT. Cristina Fernández chose Daniel Filmus as her candidate for the mayor of Buenos Aires. On 21 June 2011, she announced she would run for a second term as president. A few days later, she announced Amado Boudou would run for vice-president on her ticket. She personally chose most of the candidates for deputy in the Congress, favoring members of the Cámpora. She had highly publicized disagreements with Brazil regarding the trade quotas between the two countries. She also had a major dispute with the United States after seizing an American military airplane, accusing the U.S. of smuggling in undeclared firearms, surveillance equipment, and morphine for ulterior motives.

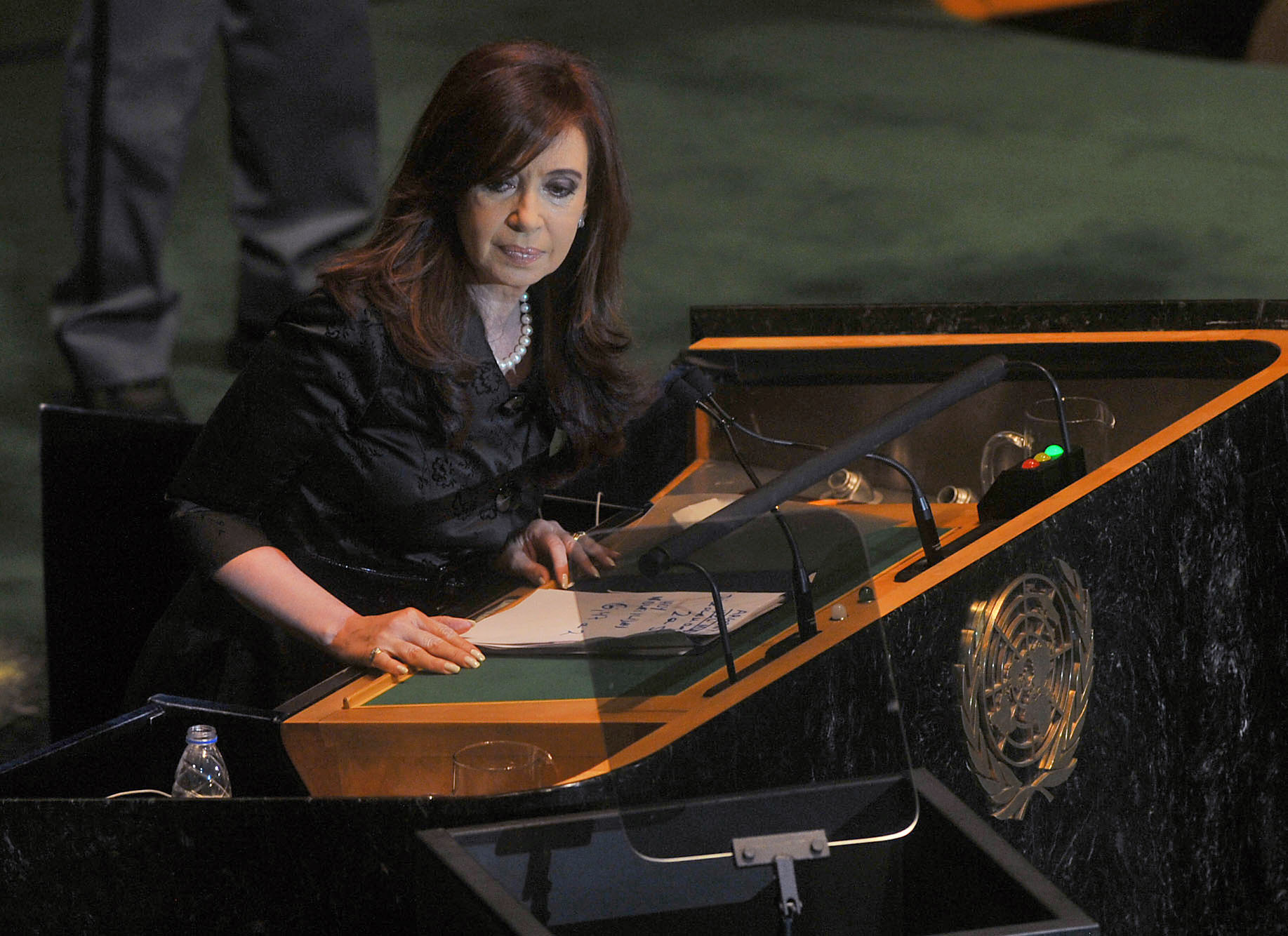
Kirchner giving a speech in the United Nations regarding the Falkland Islands

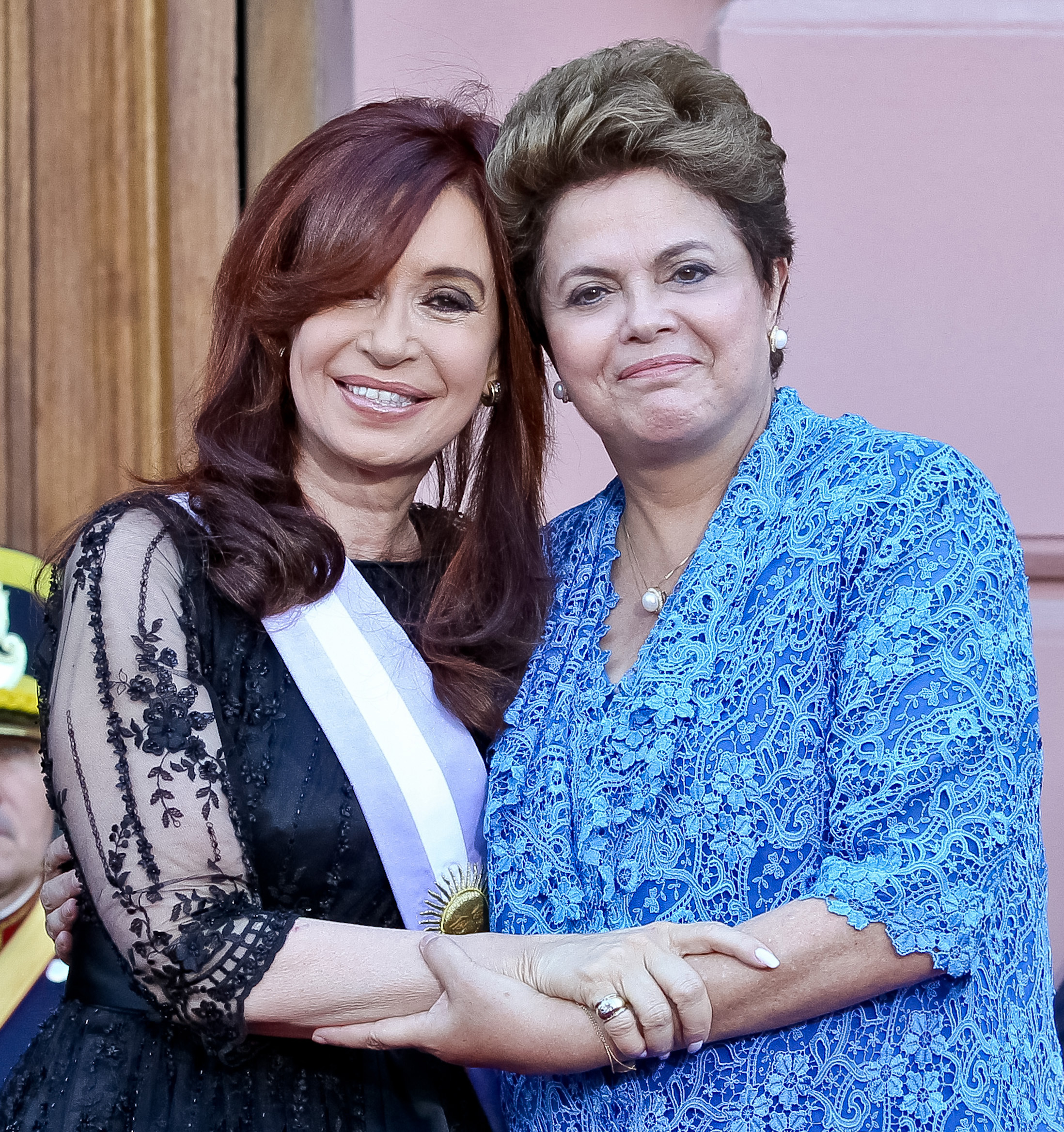
Kirchner with Brazilian president Dilma Rousseff in 2011

On 22 September, she addressed the United Nations. She supported the Palestinian request to be seated in the General Assembly, and threatened to cancel flights from Chile to the Falkland Islands in order to advance Argentine claims of sovereignty over the Islands. The 2011 election took place in October, and she won with 54.1% of the vote.

=== Second term ===
==== 2012 ====
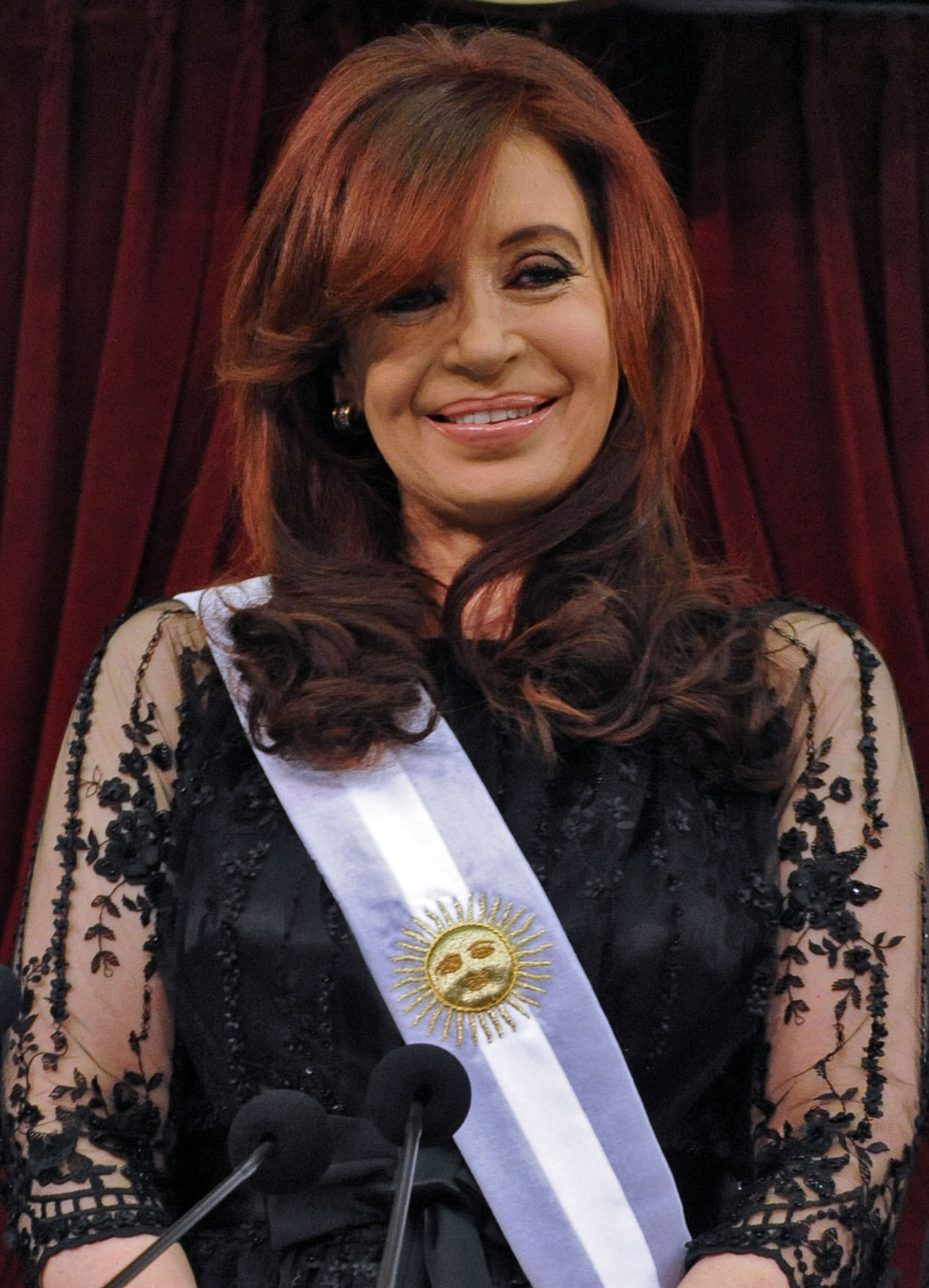
Fernández de Kirchner during her second inauguration

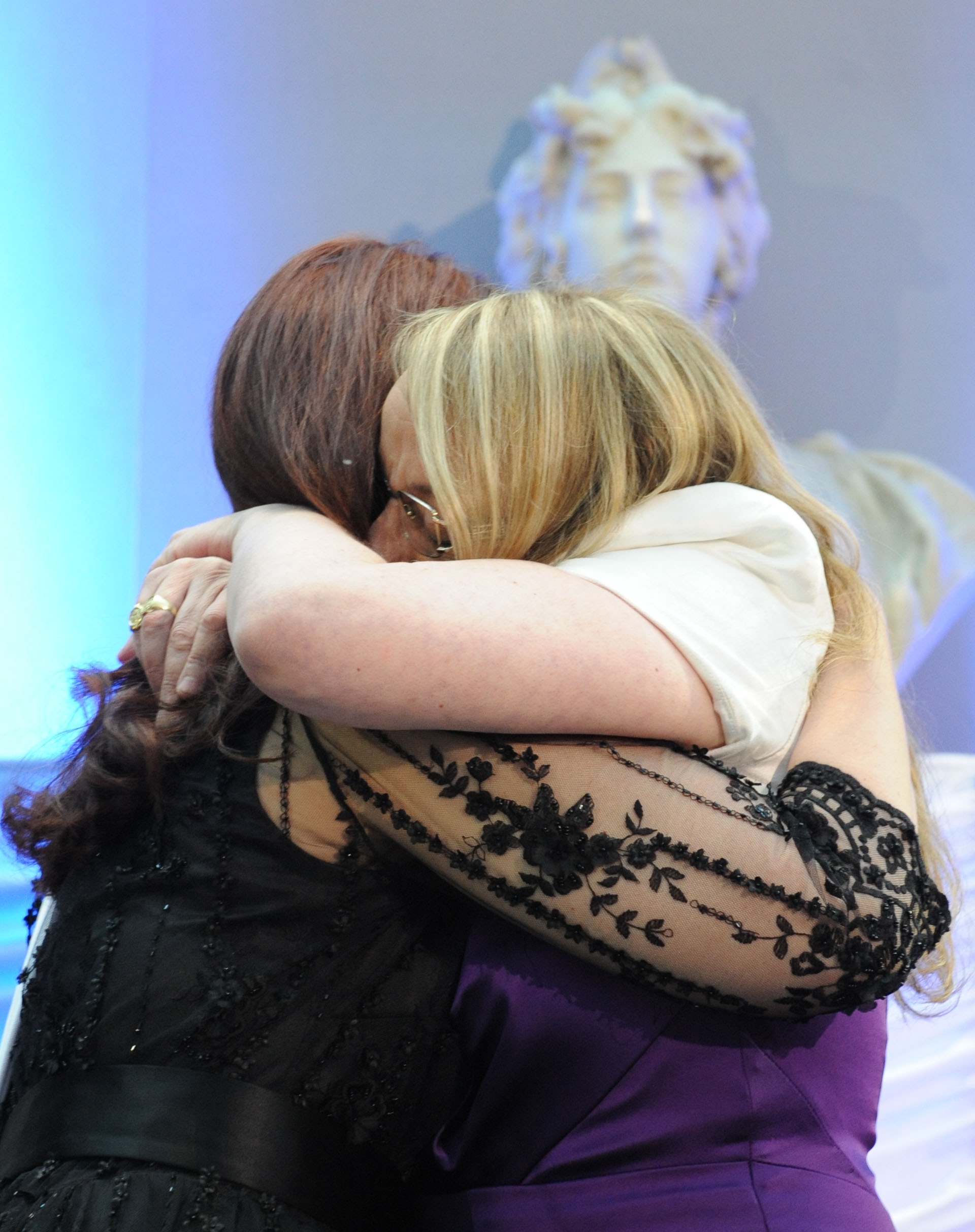
Fernández de Kirchner hugs her sister-in-law and minister of social development of her government, Alicia Kirchner, after both reassume their posts

After the electoral victory of 2011, the ruling party regained control over both chambers of Congress. They initiated a period of fiscal reform, which included several tax increases, limits to wage increases, but increases in protectionism and reorganization of state-owned enterprises. Congress passed an anti-terrorism law, criticized for its vague and imprecise terms, that may allow it to be used against political opponents of the government. Hugo Moyano, main union leader, who was a strong supporter of kirchnerism, began to oppose the president. Moyano would later organize a big protest at Plaza de Mayo, with 30,000 people, requesting the abolition of capital gains tax. However, her close union ally Enrique Omar Suárez, another powerful union leader, has remained in support of her. The vice president Amado Boudou got involved in a political scandal, suspected of favoring the Ciccone currency printing business. The poor maintenance of rail services led to a rail disaster that left 51 dead and 703 injured. The government has also begun to devote more attention to the Falkland Islands sovereignty dispute (prompted by the 30th anniversary of the Falklands War). Fernández also supported the nationalization of YPF.

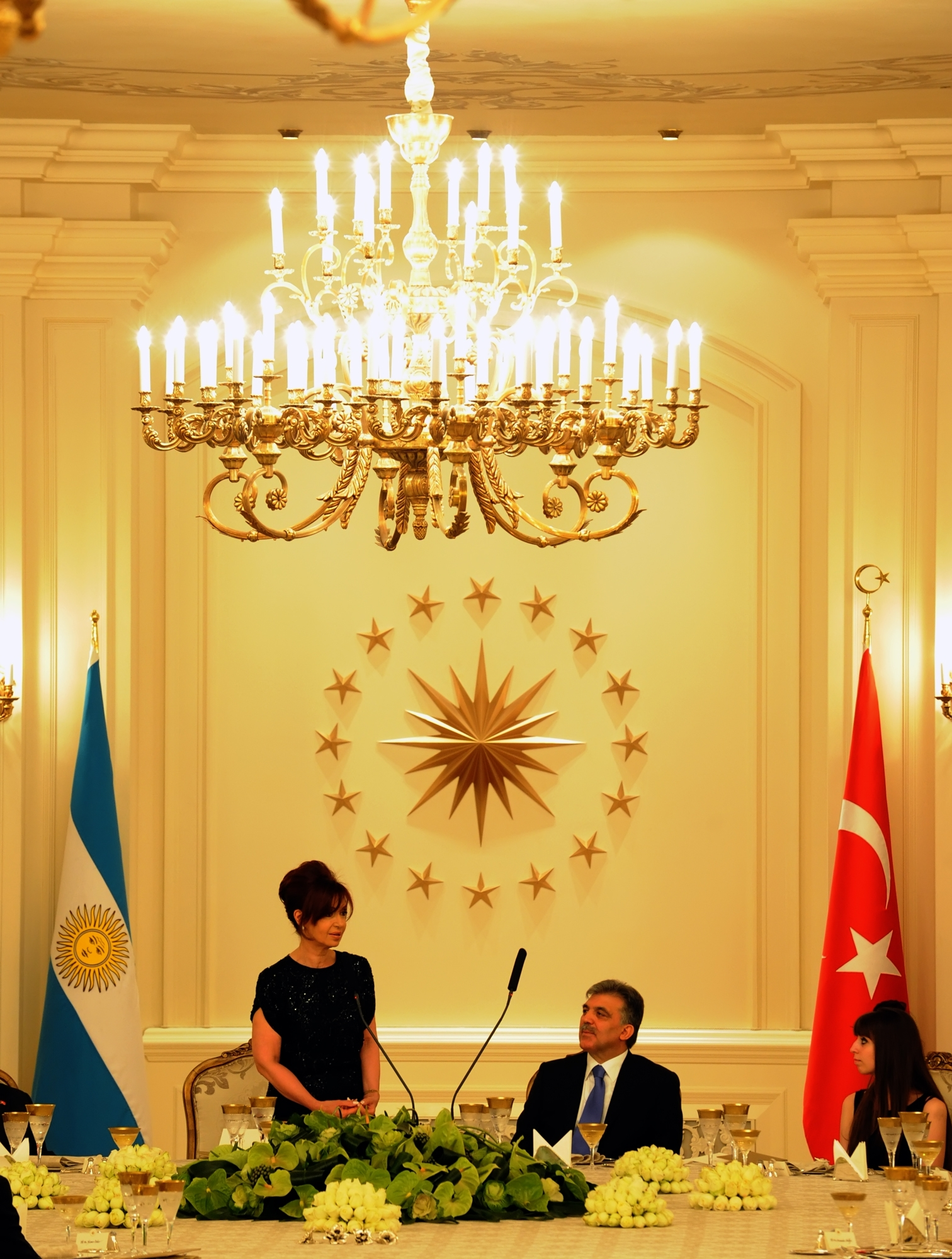
Fernández de Kirchner with Turkish president Abdullah Gul in Ankara, 2011

In 2012, the government tightened currency controls, allowing access to other currencies to only those people who traveled outside the country. The blockade of other currencies affected financial activities and led to a black market in currencies. On 15 May, The governor of the Buenos Aires province Daniel Scioli voiced his intention to run for the presidency in 2015. On 11 July, Fernández criticized the administration of the Buenos Aires province because the provincial government didn't have money to pay their workers wages. The province requested a transfer of funds from the federal government but were initially denied by Kirchner. On 20 July, the federal government agreed to transfer funds to the province. Moyano claimed the denial to transfer funds was to harm Scioli's image, as Scioli has the highest rate of approval of any governor in the nation.

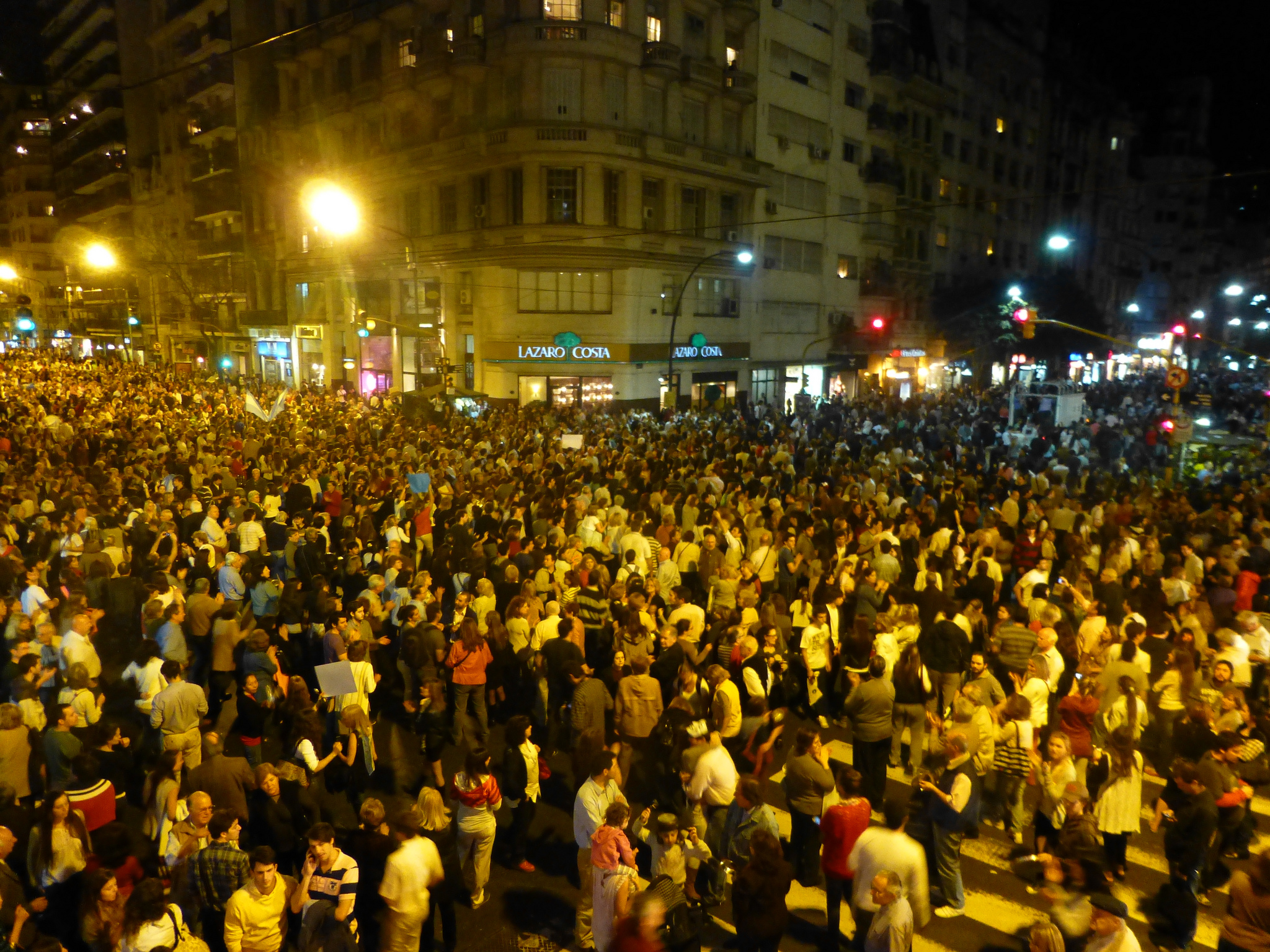
200,000 people took part in a cacerolazo against Kirchner

Several other political scandals came to light in 2012, such as the alleged liberation of sentenced prisoners for government-organized demonstrations, and media accusations of political advocacy of The Cámpora at elementary and high schools. More than 200,000 people in many cities of the country took part in a protest against Kirchner in September 2012; the protest was followed by a protest of the gendarmeria and another of the CTA. The largest demonstration was the 8N, which took place on 8 November.

The managing director of the IMF, Christine Lagarde, warned the Kirchner Administration of the need for Argentina to provide the IMF with reliable estimates of inflation and growth. A BBC report noted that, while official government data reported inflation at 10 percent, private economists estimated the true rate at around 24 percent. Kirchner rejected Lagarde's demands.

Her administration sought to increase bilateral relations with Angola and Iran. Since there is suspected Iranian involvement in the 1994 AMIA bombing, Kirchner's relations with the Argentine Jewish community deteriorated. Fernández gave her United Nations General Assembly speech where she again criticized Britain over the Falklands (Malvinas) issue, and Iran for the 1994 AMIA bombing while giving her support for an Israeli-Palestinian dialogue and an eventual Palestinian state.

The Argentine navy training ship ARA Libertad (Q-2) was impounded in Ghana in October 2012 as part of an extended legal battle between Kirchner's administration and "holdout" holders of Argentine government debt who had refused to accept the earlier write-down of principal and who continue to pursue full payment through the courts. On 26 October, New York judge Thomas Griesa issued a ruling favoring the holdout creditors, and against the government's practice of excluding them from payments made to those bondholders who had participated in the earlier debt restructuring. The government is appealing Griesa's judgment.

==== 2013 ====
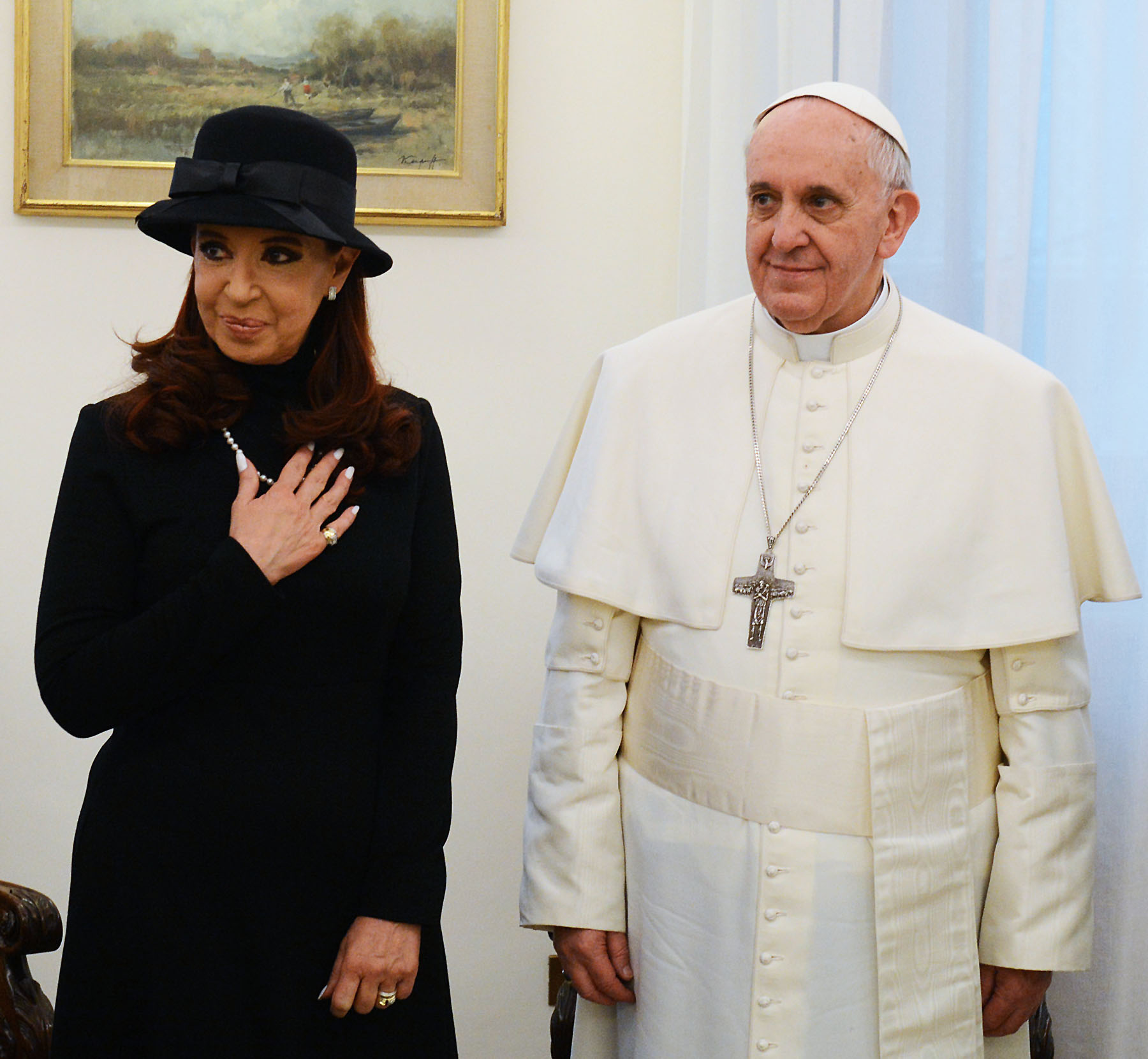
Kirchner meeting with Pope Francis in 2013.

Argentina signed an accord with Iran in relation to the Amia bombing. According to it, the Iranian suspects will be interrogated in Iran, under Iranian law. Not all suspects would be interrogated, but only those with a "red alert" arrest order from Interpol. This accord was rejected by the opposition parties and the Jewish community, who deemed it unconstitutional.

Buenos Aires and La Plata suffered floods in April, with more than 70 deaths. Mayor Mauricio Macri pointed that the national government prevents the city from taking international loans, which did not allow for infrastructure improvements. A week later, Kirchner announced an amendment of the Argentine judiciary. Three bills were controversial: the first proposes to limit the injunctions against the state, the second to include people selected in national elections at the body that appoints or accuses judges, and the third to create a new court that would limit the number of cases treated by the Supreme Court. The opposition considered that those bills attempt to control the judiciary. The 2013 season of the investigative journalism program Periodismo para todos revealed an ongoing case of political corruption, named "The Route of the K-Money", which generated a huge political controversy. Both things led to a huge cacerolazo on 18 April, known as the 18A.

The aforementioned amendment of the judiciary was repealed by the Supreme Court, which ruled the law to be unconstitutional. The Front for Victory is defeated at the October midterm elections, with a sound victory of Sergio Massa at the populous Buenos Aires Province. Still, the government retains the majority in both houses of the Congress. The Supreme Court rules the media law to be constitutional, a pair of days after the election. Cristina Fernández, who was under medical treatment during both events, changed the cabinet at her return, appointing Jorge Capitanich as chief of cabinet, Axel Kicillof as minister of economy, Juan Carlos Fábrega as president of the Central Bank, and Carlos Casamiquela as minister of Agriculture. The interior trade secretary Guillermo Moreno resigns the following day. The international controversy over the renationalization of YPF ends with a financial compensation for Repsol. The year ends with several electricity blackouts and with police revolts at several provinces, which causes looting.

==== 2014 ====
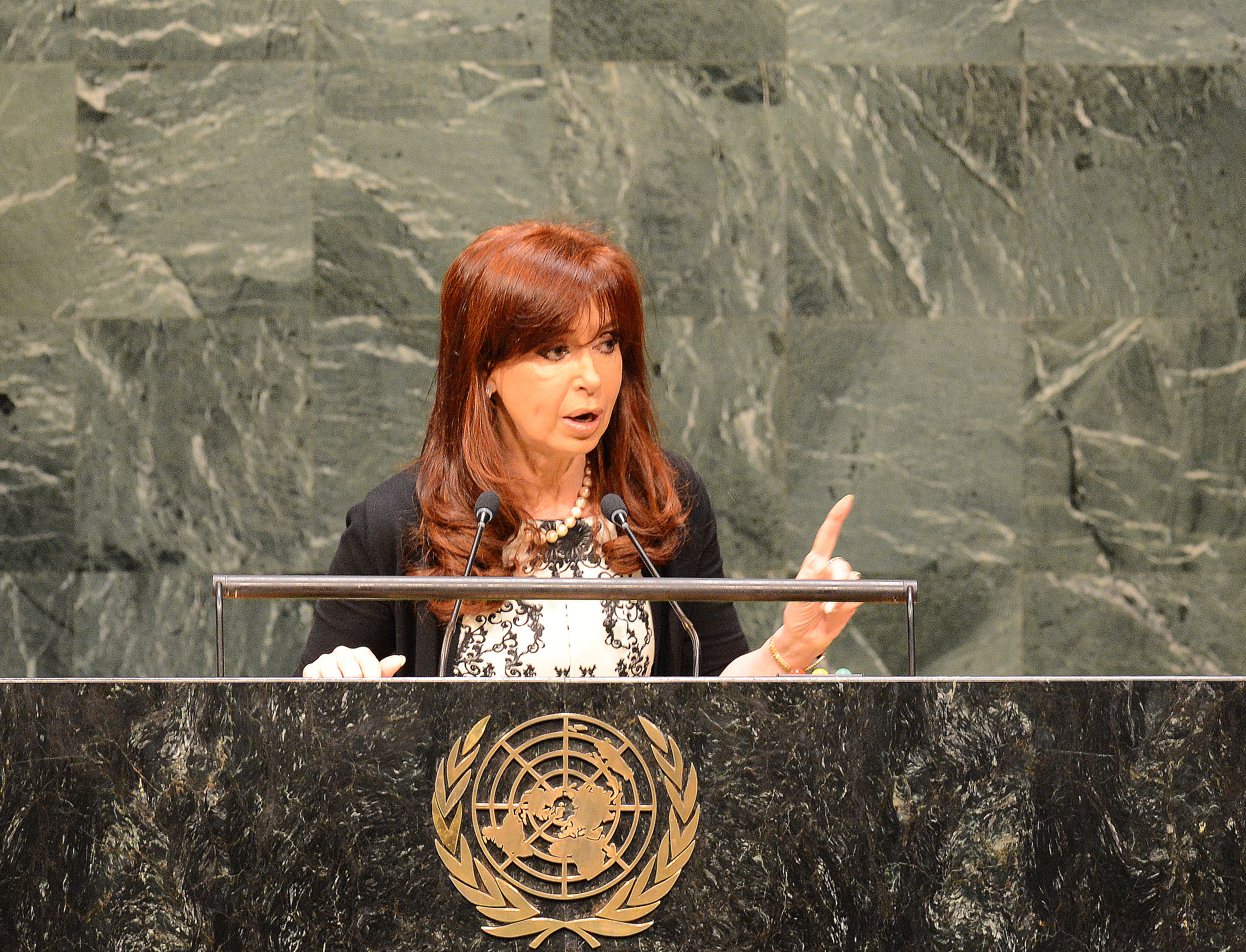
Kirchner at the UN General Assembly

The year began with a renewed economic crisis, which led to a nationwide strike of teachers, and a general strike by union leader Hugo Moyano. The crisis was temporarily solved with a rise of the interest rate. On 22 January, Cristina Fernández announced the government-sponsored programme "Progresar", which gives a monthly subsidy for youths aged 18 to 24 who wish to complete studies but are unemployed or work under the table. Cristina Kirchner visited Pope Francis for a third time. The scandal over Amado Boudou grew when he was summoned for inquiry by Federal Judge Ariel Lijo. The country paid the debt with the Paris Club. US judge Thomas P. Griesa rules that Argentina must pay as well to the hedge funds that did not enter into the Argentine debt restructuring, which Argentina failed to do. Still, the government denies that such failure may be a new sovereign default; Standard & Poor's defined it as a "selective default". She said in a speech at the United Nations that the Islamic State of Iraq and the Levant jihadist group may be trying to kill her, and later that it would be the US; Elisa Carrió dismissed such threats as mere conspiracy theories. In her speech, she accused the "vulture funds" of destabilizing the economy of the countries and called them "economic terrorists". The government promoted several new laws and law amendments, such as an overhauled civil code, hydrocarbon law and telecommunications law. Cristina Kirchner was denounced in the Hotesur scandal over a firm headed by her and her sons to manage the hotels in Calafate. She is suspected of using the hotels for money laundering. The judge Claudio Bonadio, heading the case, was in turn called for impeachment.

==== 2015 ====
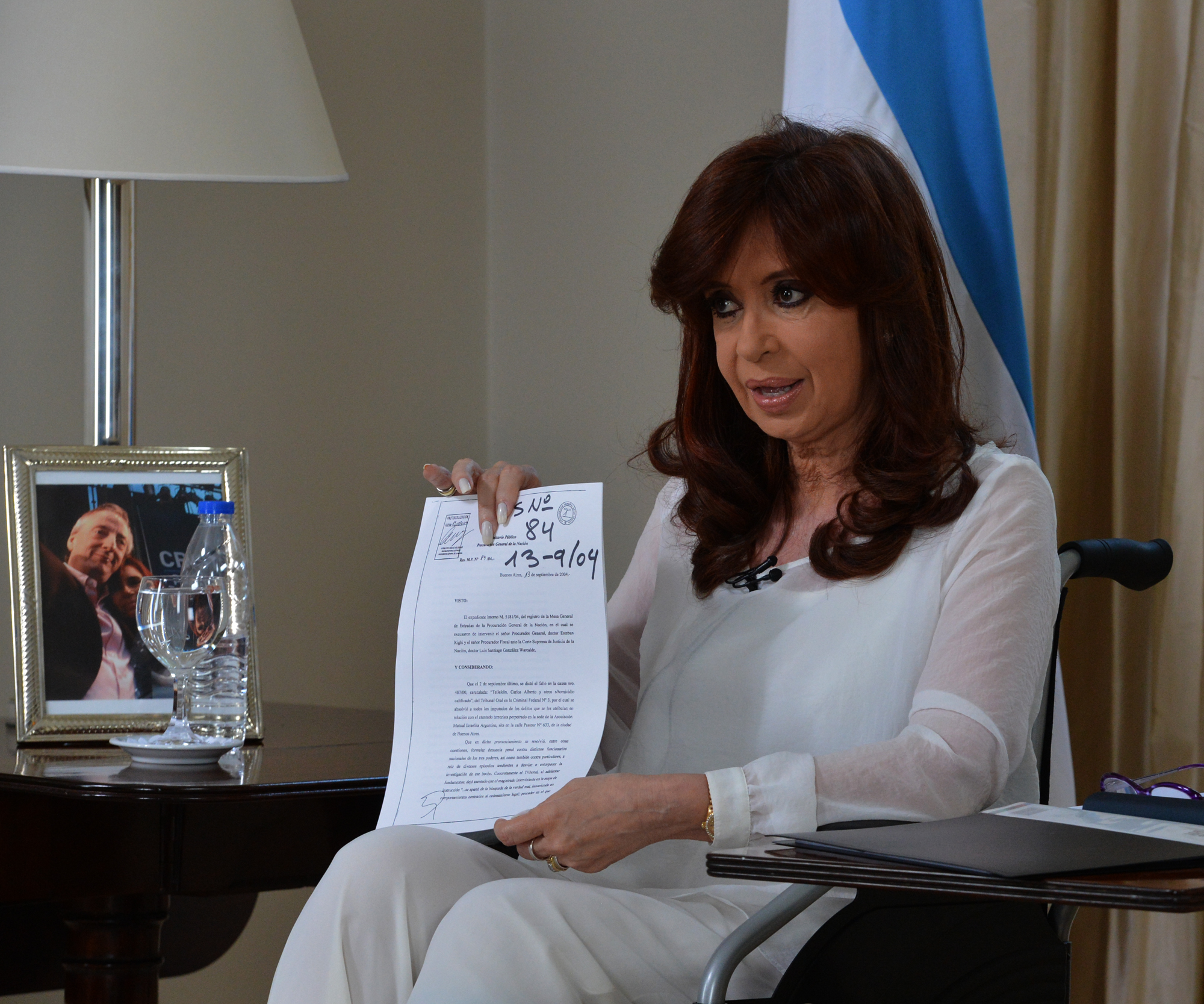
Kirchner announces the bill to dissolve the Secretariat of Intelligence

On 14 January the federal prosecutor, Alberto Nisman, filed a criminal complaint against Kirchner and others, accusing them of conspiring to cover up Iran's alleged involvement in the 1994 bombing of a Jewish community center in Buenos Aires which killed 85 and injured hundreds. On 18 January, just hours before he was set to testify in Congress against Kirchner, Nisman was found shot dead in his apartment. A gun and spent shell casing were found next to the body, and a government official said the death was likely a suicide although others considered the death suspicious. Kirchner said that Nisman was murdered by rogue agents of the Secretariat of Intelligence, and sent a bill to the Congress to dissolve it. On 3 February, Viviana Fein, the lead investigator into the death of Nisman, announced that a draft arrest warrant for the president had been found among his papers. The criminal complaint was taken by prosecutor Gerardo Pollicita, who formally accused her of conspiracy, alongside other people included in Nisman's original project. Minister Jorge Capitanich described it as "an active judicial coup". The case will be heard by judge Daniel Rafecas.

In December 2016, a year after her term as president ended, she and several of her former aides were indicted on “charges of illicit association and fraudulent administration.” The order force up to $633m of each defendant’s assets. Fernandez maintained no wrongdoing, and earlier had alleged she was the “victim of persecution by her conservative successor, Mauricio Macri.”

== Cabinet ==
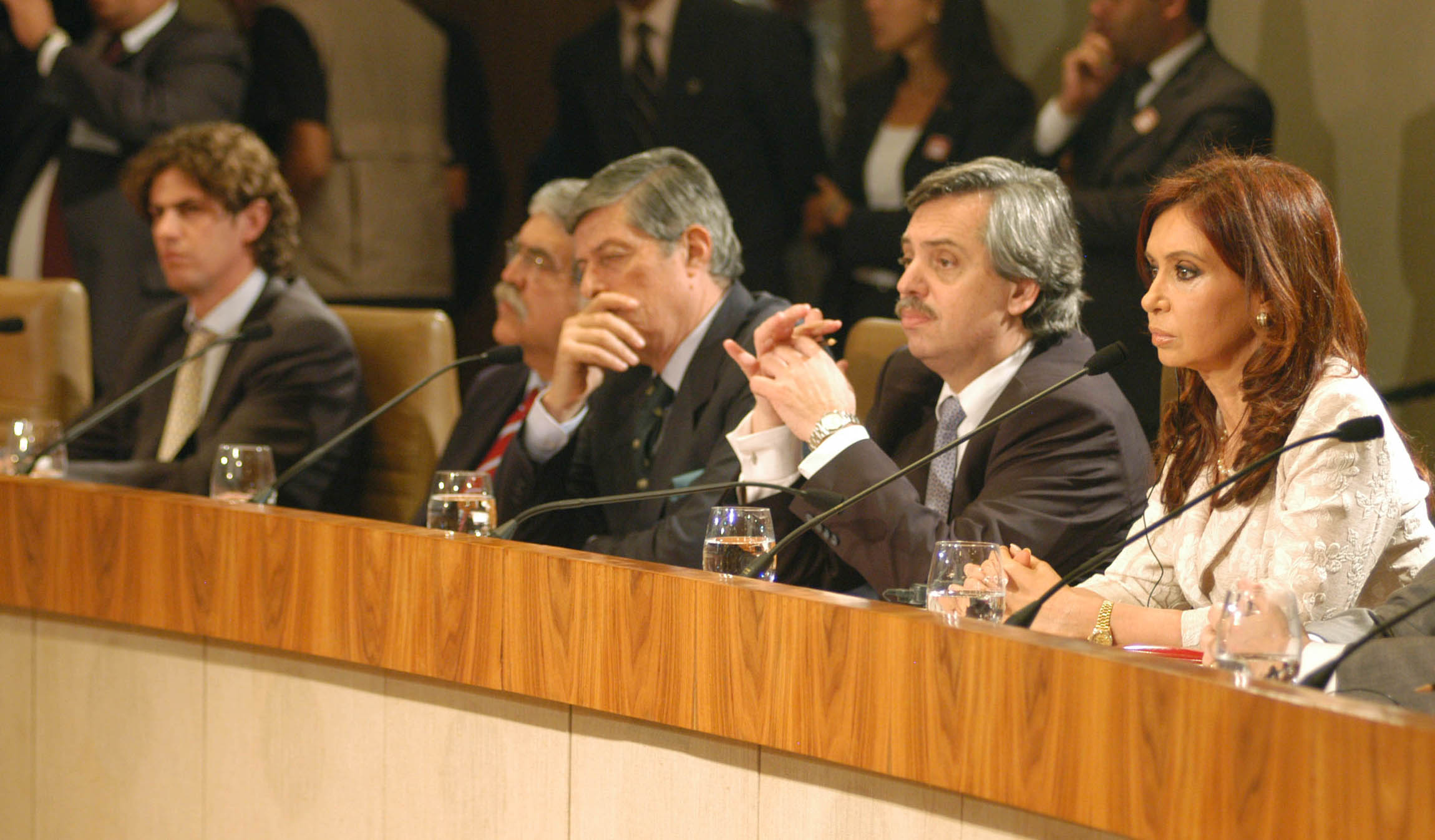
Kirchner in a meeting with her ministers

On 14 November 2007, the president-elect publicly announced the names of her new cabinet, which was sworn in on 10 December. Of the 12 ministers appointed, seven were already ministers in Néstor Kirchner's government, while the other five took office for the first time. Three other ministries were created afterwards.

=== Ministries ===
Ministry	Minister	Party	Start	End
Cabinet Chief	Alberto Fernández	Justicialist Party	10 December 2007	23 July 2008
Cabinet Chief	Sergio Massa	Justicialist Party	23 July 2008	7 July 2009
Cabinet Chief	Aníbal Fernández	Justicialist Party	7 July 2009	10 December 2011
Cabinet Chief	Juan Manuel Abal Medina Jr.	Justicialist Party	10 December 2011	20 November 2013
Cabinet Chief	Jorge Capitanich	Justicialist Party	20 November 2013	26 February 2015
Cabinet Chief	Aníbal Fernández	Justicialist Party	26 February 2015	10 December 2015
Minister of the Interior and Transport (Note: Until 6 June 2012 known as the Ministry of the Interior, as the Secretariat of Transport was incorporated into the ministry from the Ministry of Federal Planning, Public Investment and Services.)	Florencio Randazzo	Justicialist Party	10 December 2007	10 December 2015
Minister of Foreign Affairs and Worship (Note: Until 18 June 2010 known as the Ministry of Foreign Affairs, International Trade and Worship, as the Secretariat of International Trade was moved to the Ministry of Economy and Public Finances.)	Jorge Taiana	Justicialist Party	10 December 2007	18 June 2010
Minister of Foreign Affairs and Worship	Héctor Timerman	Independent	18 June 2010	10 December 2015
Minister of Defense	Nilda Garré	Broad Front	10 December 2007	10 December 2010
Minister of Defense	Arturo Puricelli	Justicialist Party	10 December 2010	3 June 2013
Minister of Defense	Agustín Rossi	Justicialist Party	3 June 2013	10 December 2015
Minister of Economy and Public Finances (Note: Until 24 April 2008 known as the Ministry of Economy and Production.)	Martín Lousteau	Independent	10 December 2007	25 April 2008
Minister of Economy and Public Finances	Carlos Rafael Fernández	Justicialist Party	25 April 2008	7 July 2009
Minister of Economy and Public Finances	Amado Boudou	Independent	7 July 2009	10 December 2011
Minister of Economy and Public Finances	Hernán Lorenzino	Independent	10 December 2011	20 November 2013
Minister of Economy and Public Finances	Axel Kicillof	Independent	20 November 2013	10 December 2015
Minister of Industry	Débora Giorgi	Independent	26 November 2008	10 December 2015
Minister of Tourism	Enrique Meyer	Justicialist Party	1 July 2010	10 December 2015
Minister of Federal Planning, Public Investment and Services	Julio de Vido	Justicialist Party	10 December 2007	10 December 2015
Minister of Justice and Human Rights (Note: Until 10 December 2010 known as the Ministry of Justice, Security and Human Rights, as the Secretariat of Security was elevated to ministerial level.)	Aníbal Fernández	Justicialist Party	10 December 2007	7 July 2009
Minister of Justice and Human Rights	Julio Alak	Justicialist Party	8 July 2009	10 December 2015
Minister of Labour, Employment and Social Security	Carlos Tomada	Justicialist Party	10 December 2007	10 December 2015
Minister of Health	Graciela Ocaña	Independent	10 December 2007	29 June 2009
Minister of Health	Juan Luis Manzur	Justicialist Party	29 June 2009	26 February 2015
Minister of Health	Daniel Gollán	Independent	26 February 2015	10 December 2015
Minister of Social Development	Alicia Kirchner	Kolina	10 December 2007	10 December 2015
Minister of Education	Juan Carlos Tedesco	Independent	10 December 2007	20 July 2009
Minister of Education	Alberto Sileoni	Justicialist Party	20 July 2009	10 December 2015
Minister of Science, Technology and Productive Innovation	Lino Barañao	Independent	10 December 2007	10 December 2015
Minister of Agriculture, Livestock, Fisheries and Food	Julián Domínguez	Justicialist Party	10 December 2007	10 December 2011
Minister of Agriculture, Livestock, Fisheries and Food	Norberto Yahuar	Justicialist Party	10 December 2011	20 November 2013
Minister of Agriculture, Livestock, Fisheries and Food	Carlos Casamiquela	Independent	20 November 2013	10 December 2015
Minister of Security	Nilda Garré	Broad Front	10 December 2010	3 June 2013
Minister of Security	Arturo Puricelli	Justicialist Party	3 June 2013	4 December 2013
Minister of Security	María Cecilia Rodríguez	New Encounter	4 December 2013	10 December 2015
Minister of Culture	Teresa Parodi	Independent	7 May 2014	10 December 2015

=== Presidential secretariats ===
Ministry	Minister	Party	Start	End
General Secretary	Oscar Parrilli	Justicialist Party	10 December 2007	16 September 2014
General Secretary	Aníbal Fernández	Justicialist Party	16 September 2014	26 February 2015
General Secretary	Eduardo de Pedro	Justicialist Party	26 February 2015	10 December 2015
Legal and Technical Secretary	Carlos Zannini	Justicialist Party	10 December 2007	10 December 2015
Secretary of Intelligence (Note: Disestablished in 2015 and reformed into the Federal Intelligence Agency – outside the scope of the Presidency.)	Héctor Icazuriaga	Justicialist Party	10 December 2007	16 December 2014
Secretary of Intelligence	Oscar Parrilli	Justicialist Party	16 December 2014	5 March 2015
Secretary of Culture (Note: Until 7 May 2014, when it was elevated to ministerial level.)	José Nun	Independent	10 December 2007	8 July 2009
Secretary of Culture	Jorge Coscia	Justicialist Party	8 July 2009	7 May 2014
Secretary of Programming for the Prevention of Drug Addiction and the Fight against Drug Trafficking	José Ramón Granero	Justicialist Party	10 December 2007	10 December 2011
Secretary of Programming for the Prevention of Drug Addiction and the Fight against Drug Trafficking	Rafael Bielsa	Justicialist Party	30 December 2011	20 March 2013
Secretary of Programming for the Prevention of Drug Addiction and the Fight against Drug Trafficking	Juan Carlos Molina (es)	Justicialist Party	29 November 2013	19 May 2015
Secretary of Programming for the Prevention of Drug Addiction and the Fight against Drug Trafficking	Gabriel Lerner	Kolina	19 May 2015	10 December 2015

== Policies ==
=== Foreign policy ===
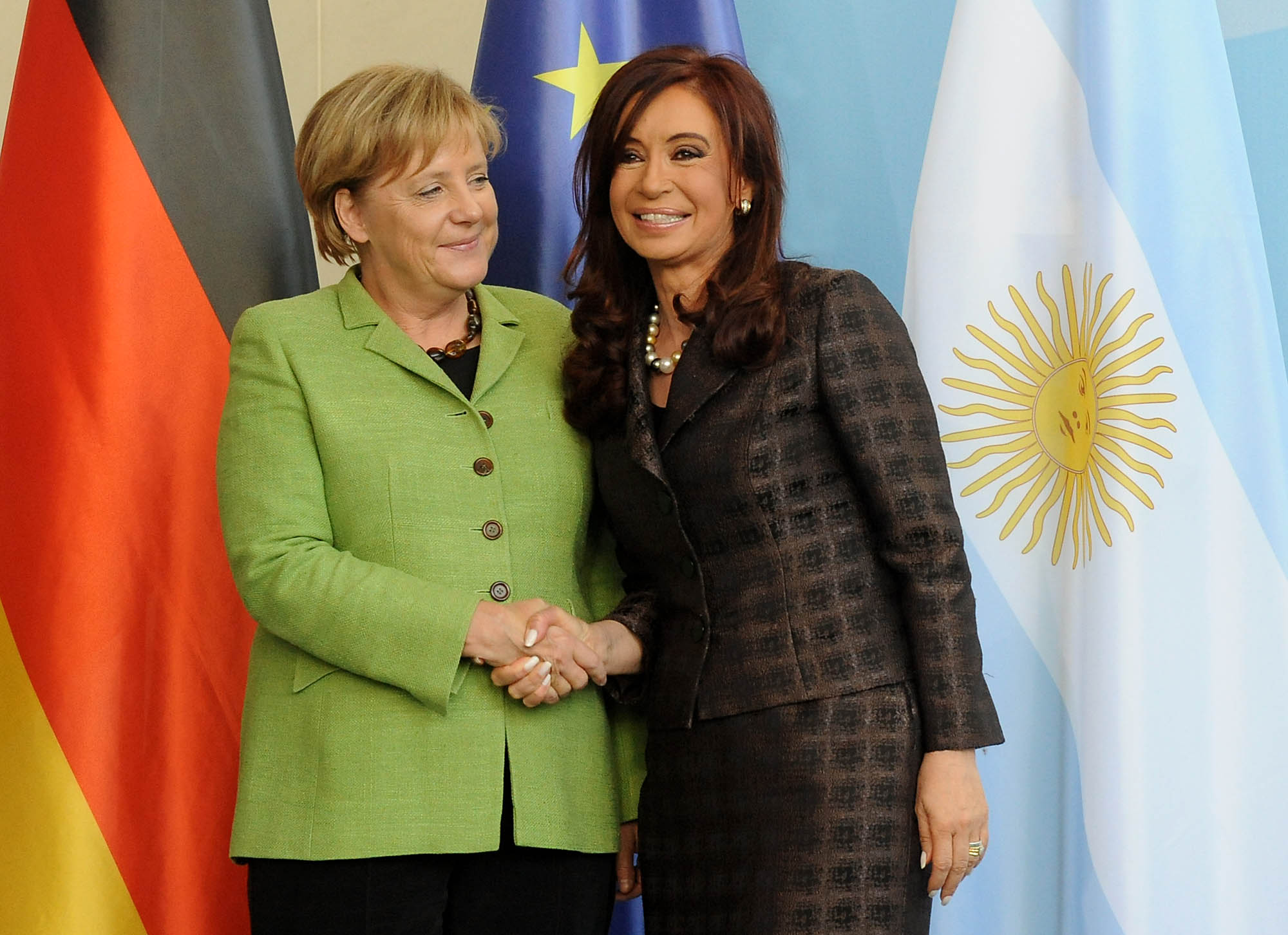
Fernández de Kirchner and German chancellor, Angela Merkel, in 2010

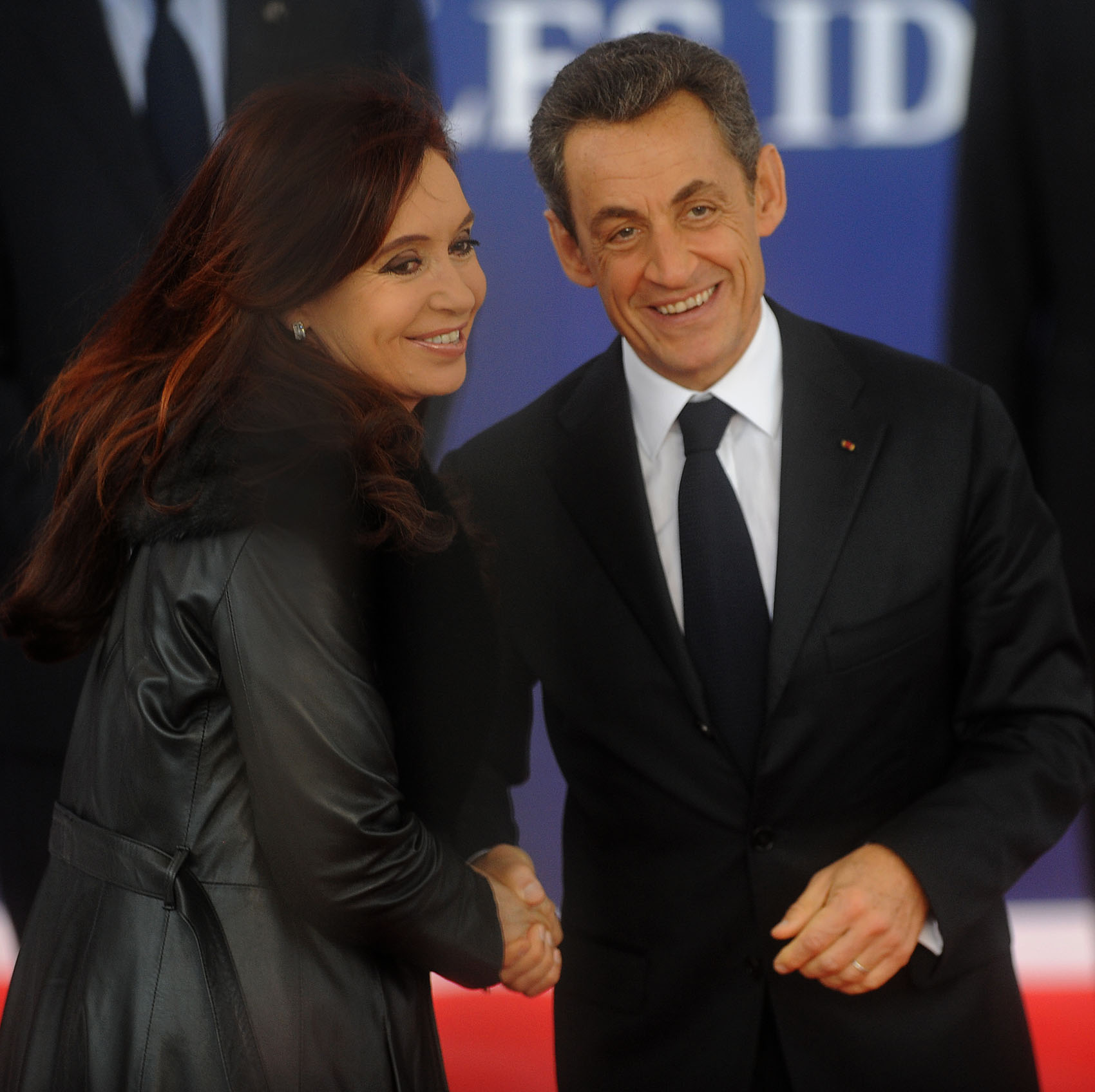
Fernández de Kirchner and French President Nicolas Sarkozy in 2011

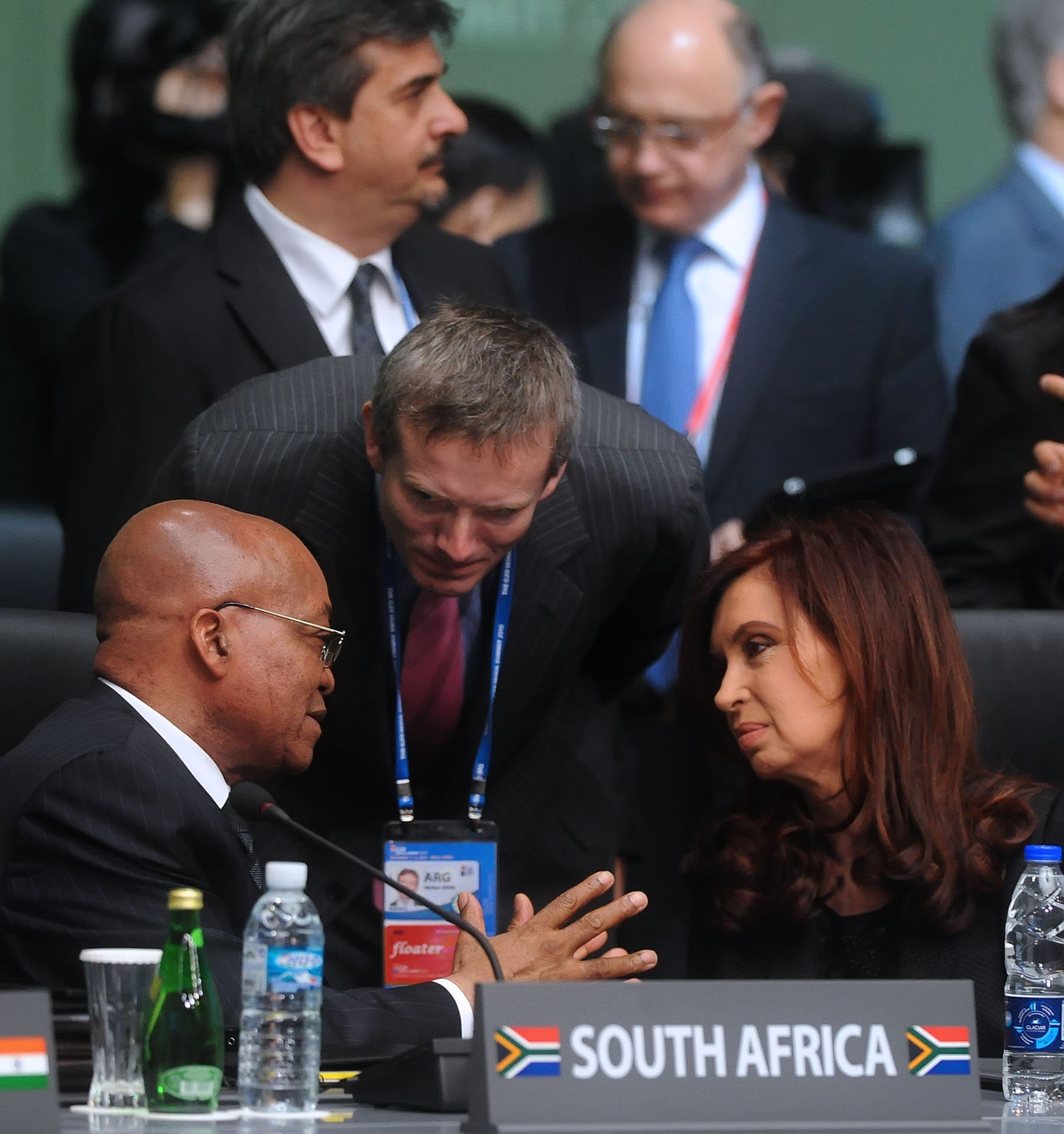
Fernández de Kirchner with South African President, Jacob Zuma in 2011

She said in a speech at the United Nations that the Islamic State of Iraq and the Levant jihadist group may be trying to kill her, and later that there could be a conspiracy against her led by the US; Elisa Carrió dismissed such threats as mere conspiracy theories. In her speech, she accused the "vulture funds" of destabilizing the economy of the countries and called them "economic terrorists".

==== Latin America ====
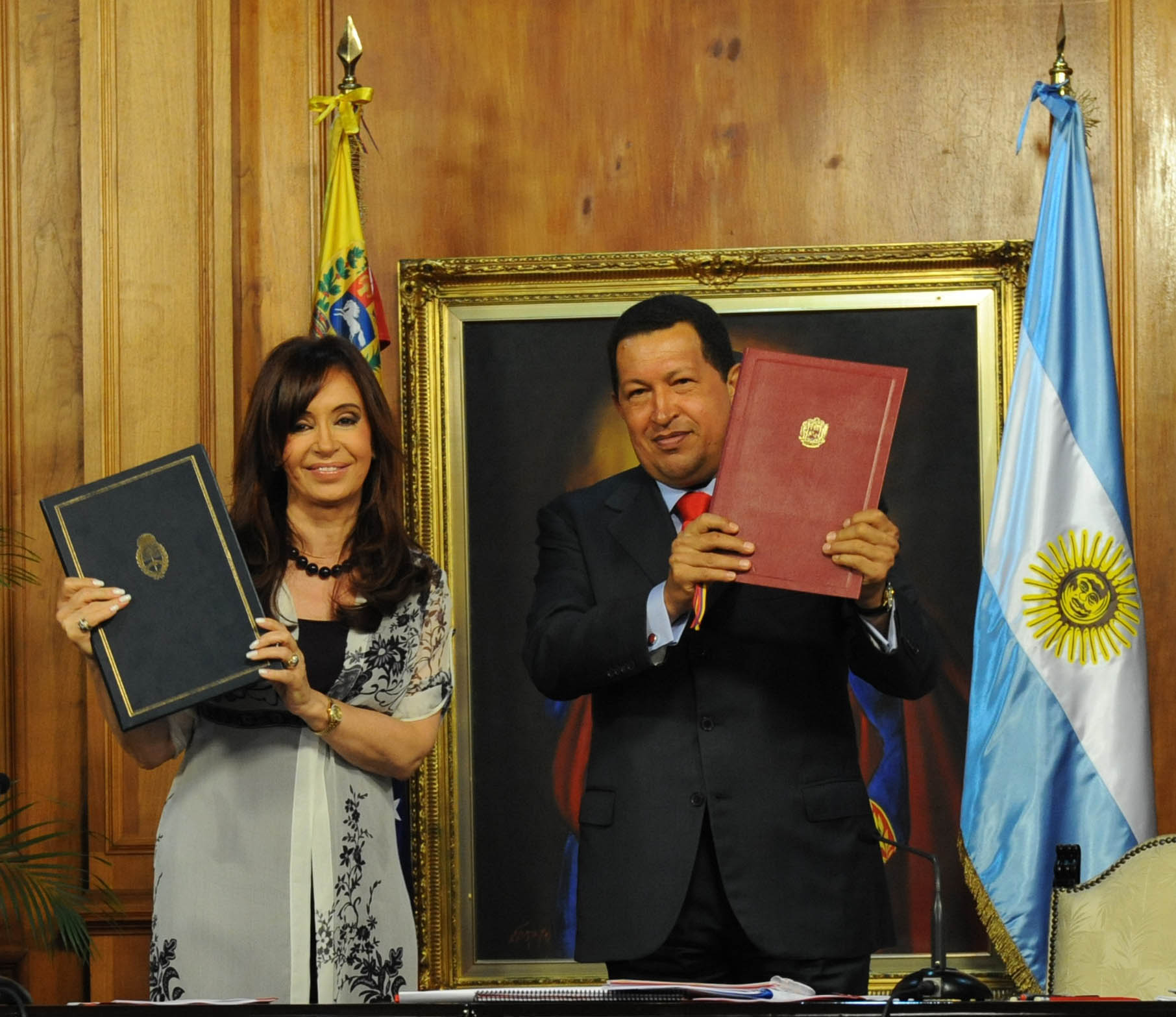
Cristina Fernández de Kirchner with Venezuelan president and personal friend, Hugo Chávez

In March 2010, Fernández de Kirchner made a historic trip to Peru to make amends, a country with whom relations had been adversely affected following the Carlos Menem administration's illegal sale of weapons to Ecuador in the 1990s.

On 19 April, she was invited to the bicentenary of the independence celebrations in Venezuela, where she was the main speaker in front of the National Assembly. She signed 25 trade agreements with Venezuela relating to food, technology and energy.

On 30 September, she hosted the UNASUR presidents' emergency summit at Buenos Aires due to the Ecuador crisis. She then began an official visit to Germany the next day in order to participate as a Guest of Honor at the Frankfurt Book Fair and meet Chancellor Angela Merkel. In October she inaugurated the Three News Agencies World Congress held in Bariloche.

In 2014, she unveiled a statue of her late husband, Nestor Kirchner, who was the first secretary-general of UNASUR, that will stand in front of the UNASUR headquarters in Quito, Ecuador.

==== United States ====
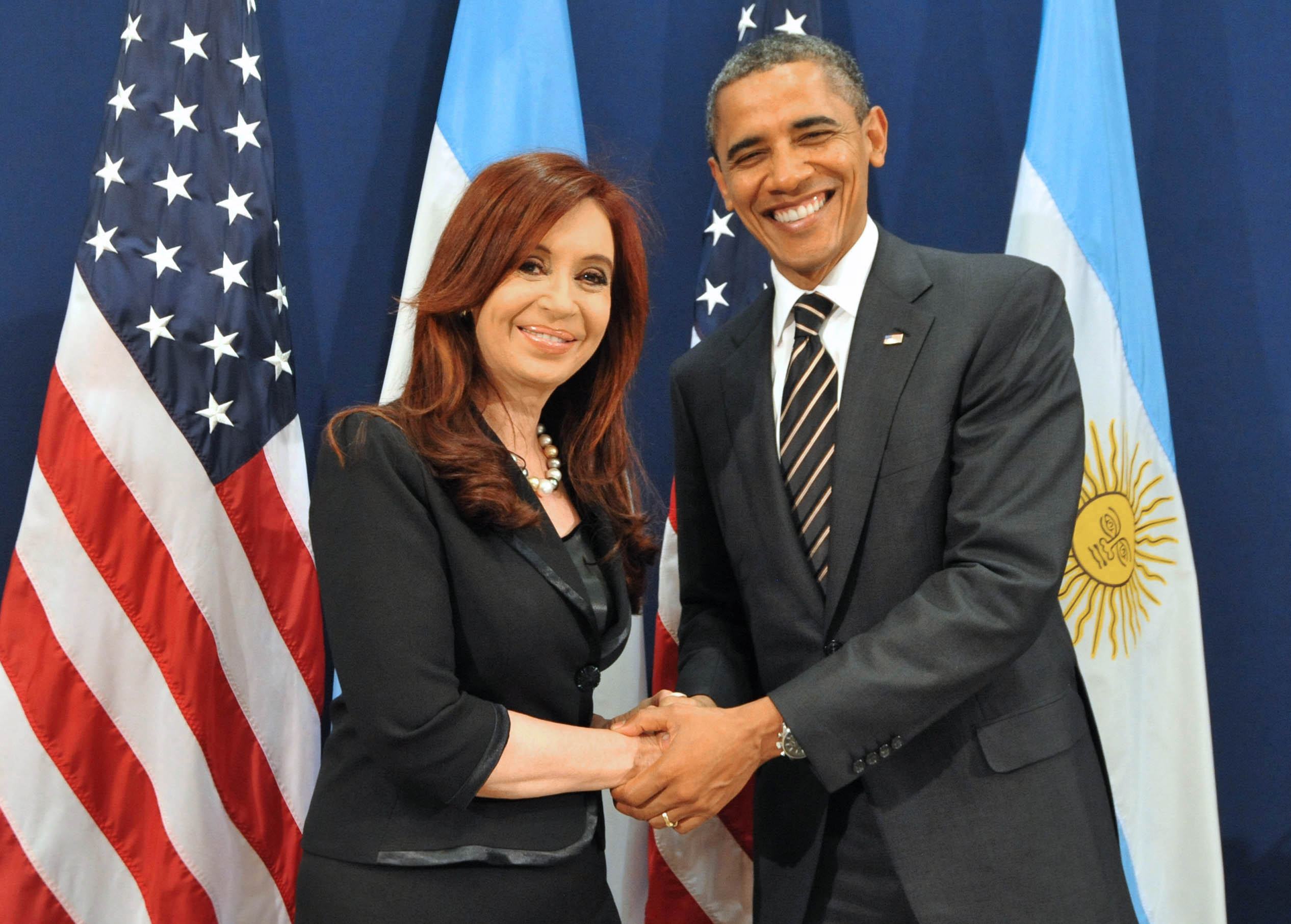
Fernández de Kirchner and US President Barack Obama in 2011

Fernández received a visit of US Secretary of State Hillary Clinton in Buenos Aires, where she received great support for the way her administration was managing its foreign debt and emphasized the positive relationship between the two countries something which was not reported by local major news media.

She also had a major dispute with the United States after seizing an American military airplane, accusing the U.S. of smuggling in undeclared firearms, surveillance equipment, and morphine for ulterior motives.

==== United Kingdom ====
On 22 February 2010, British oil explorer Desire Petroleum started drilling exploration wells some 100 kilometres (60 mi) north of the disputed Falkland Islands, despite strong opposition from Argentina which took the issue to the Latin America and Caribbean presidents summit where it received unanimous support. According to geological surveys carried out in 1998, there could be 60 billion barrels (9.5×10^{9} m^{3}) of oil in the area around the islands but the initial 2010 drilling produced poor results. As a result, Desire's share price plummeted and the company announced further drilling could begin later in 2010.

==== Middle East ====
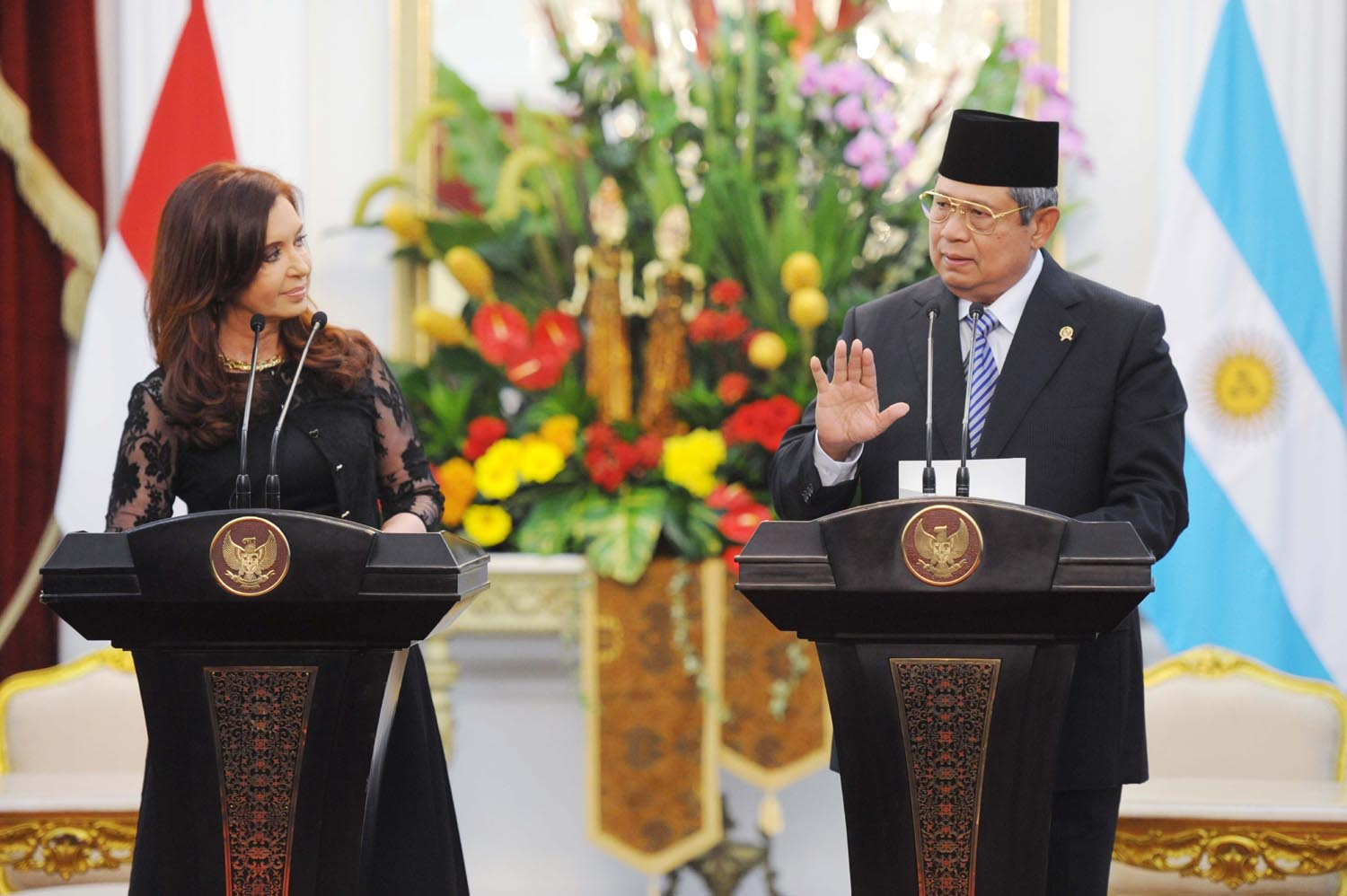
Fernández de Kirchner with Indonesian president Susilo Bambang Yudhoyono, during her state visit to Jakarta, January 2013

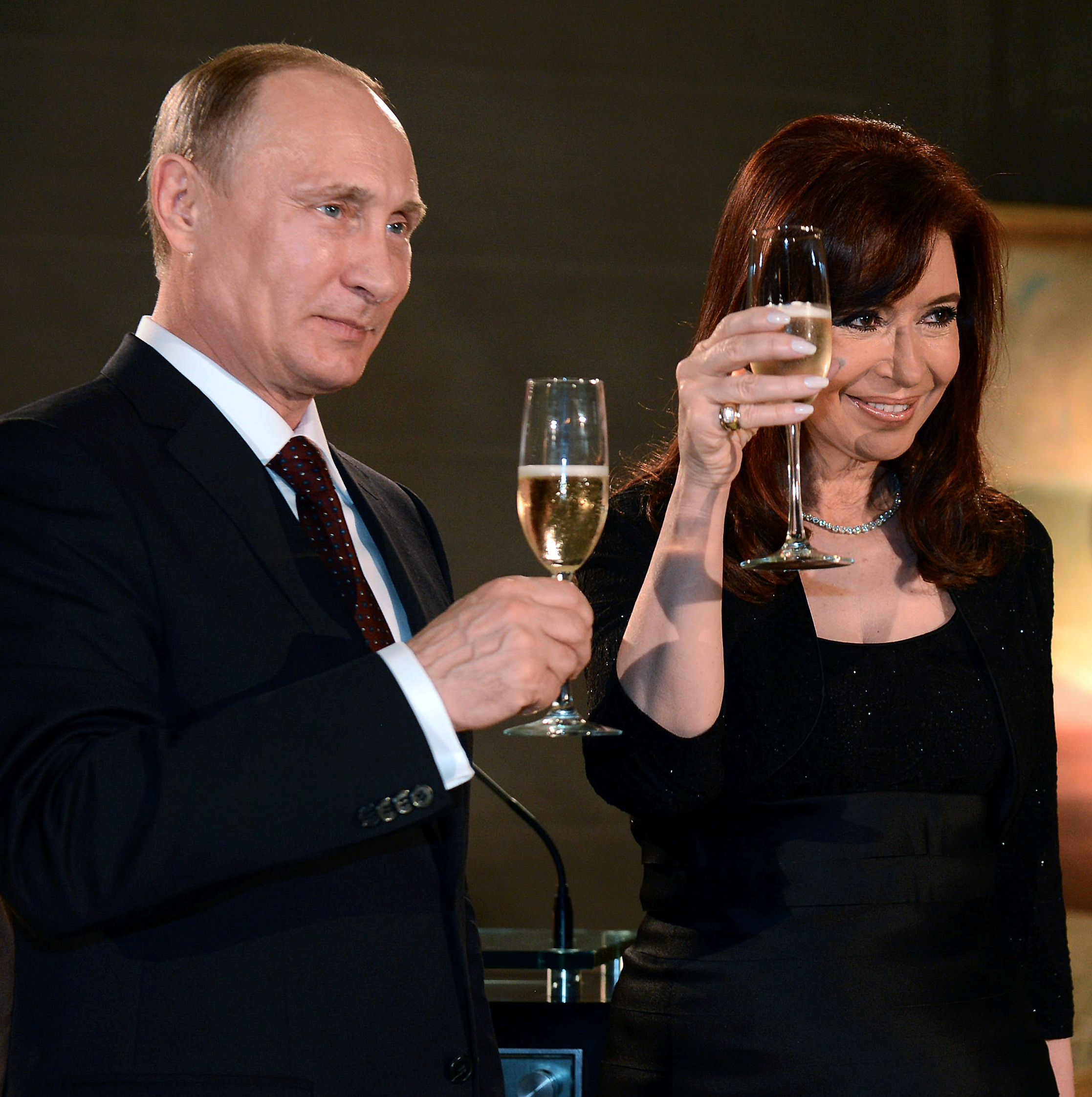
Fernández de Kirchner with Russian President Vladimir Putin in Argentina, July 2014

Her administration sought to increase bilateral relations with Angola and Iran. Since there is suspected Iranian involvement in the 1994 AMIA bombing, Kirchner's relations with the Argentine Jewish community deteriorated. Fernández gave her United Nations General Assembly speech where she again criticized Britain over the Falklands issue, and Iran for the 1994 AMIA bombing while giving her support for an Israeli-Palestinian dialogue and an eventual Palestinian state.

Argentina signed a memorandum of understanding with Iran in relation to the Amia bombing. According to it, the Iranian suspects will be interrogated in Iran, under Iranian law. Not all suspects would be interrogated, but only those with a "red alert" arrest order from Interpol. This accord was rejected by the opposition parties and the Jewish community, who deemed it unconstitutional.

In 2004, Alberto Nisman was appointed as a special prosecutor in charge of the AMIA bombing investigation in which 85 people were killed. He produced an indictment for seven Iranian officials, including a former Iranian president and Hezbollah's senior military commander. In 2013, Kirchner signed a deal establishing a "truth commission" permitting Argentine judges to travel to Tehran and interview the suspects. On 14 January 2015, Nisman accused the president of engaging in a criminal conspiracy to bury the AMIA case. On 18 January 2015 Nisman died. Initially, Kirchner declared his death a suicide, but reversed herself days later, saying that Nisman had been murdered in a conspiracy to frame her. The circumstances surrounding Nisman's death and Kirchner's comments have generated controversy among Argentinians.

==== China ====
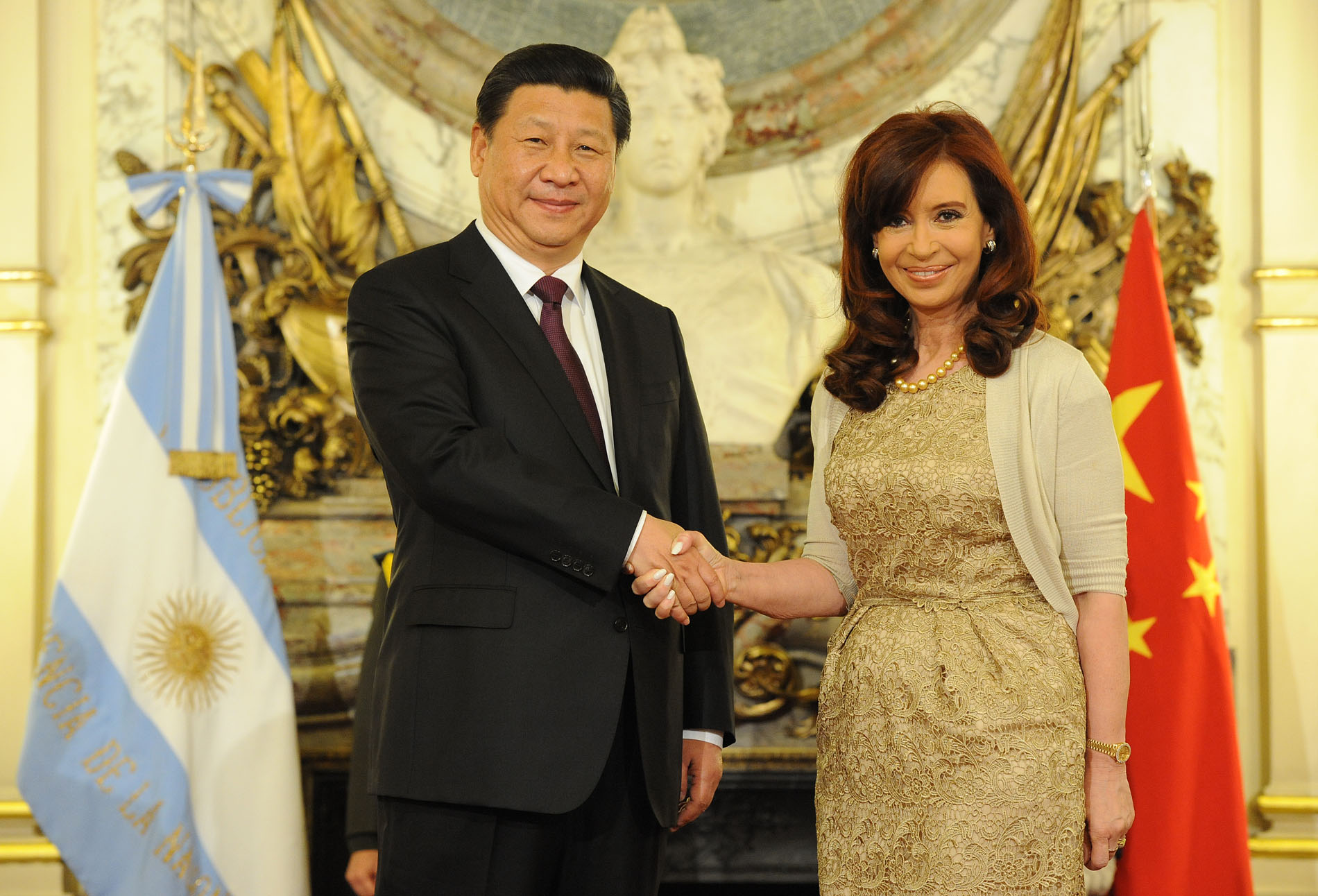
Kirchner and Chinese president Xi Jinping, in Buenos Aires, 2014

In July 2010, she traveled to the People's Republic of China with the goal of strengthening the strategic partnership between the two countries. In 2015, during a trip to China, she tweeted a message replacing the letter "r" with the letter "l" so as to write in Spanish, "lice and petloleum", instead of "rice and petroleum", seemingly mocking the accent of the Chinese hosts. Another message was released shortly afterwards apologising for the initial message.

In November 2012, she signed an agreement to establish a satellite tracking facility near Las Lajas, Neuquén, operated by People's Liberation Army Strategic Support Force.

In February 2015, she and Chinese president Xi Jinping announced prospective ambitious arms sales and defense cooperation agreements extending beyond the scope of any made. These plans include Argentina's purchase or coproduction of 110 8×8 VN-1 APCs, 14 JF-17/FC-1 multirole fighters, and five P18 Malvinas class patrol ships. While the government of president Mauricio Macri, elected in December 2015, soon dropped the arms purchases from China.

=== Relationship with the media ===
Fernández and her husband have always had a tempestuous relationship with the national media, particularly the Grupo Clarín corporation, which is the owner of video cable networks, multiple TV Channels, radio stations, the main newspaper, and—through most of a decade before 2010—had a monopoly on Argentine football broadcasts: it is thus so-called opinion-former. By 2010 it was obvious to independent sources that the traditionally major news media were in a direct conflict with the government, often reporting misleading Information.

In April 2008, Kirchner received a stern public rebuke from the Argentine media owners Association (Spanish: Asociación de Entidades Periodísticas Argentinas, or ADEPA) for having publicly accused the popular cartoonist Hermenegildo Sábat of behaving like a "quasi mafioso". In addition, a government proposal to create a watchdog to monitor racism and discrimination was received with suspicion by ADEPA, who called it a "covert attempt to control the media". Néstor Kirchner, Cristina's husband and predecessor in office, received a similar rebuke for publicly and falsely denouncing Joaquín Morales Solá, a journalist critical of the government, for having produced an inflammatory text published in 1978.

On 11 September 2009, she advanced the decriminalization of injurious calumny against public officials, a charge which had, in 2000, resulted in a prison term of one year for Eduardo Kimel, a journalist investigating the San Patricio Church massacre of 1976. She drew fire for a highly controversial Audiovisual Media Law proposed shortly afterwards, however. Defended by the government as a reform intended to fragment ownership of media companies so as to encourage plurality of opinion, the bill was criticised by part of the opposition as a means to silence voices critical of the government, especially those in the Clarín media group (the country's largest). However, a significant amount of opposing congressmen voted in favor of the law, as they considered it was clearly an improvement on the existing one; also, the government had been willing to negotiate and modify parts of the proposed new law to improve it.

The law has aroused further controversy, given that in its passing through the chambers of the legislature, the mandatory seven-day period between debate and assent of the new legislation was ignored. The view among the part of the opposition that opposed the bill is that Kirchner's government is trying to rush the law through parliament before December 2009, when the government will lose its absolute majorities in Congress.

Dr. Lauro Laíño, the president of ADEPA (media owners), in a speech given on 24 September 2009, opposed the proposed law, and added that in Latin America, especially in Venezuela and Argentina, "press freedom was being undermined under the suspicious pretext of plurality". Others, notably the press freedom advocacy group Reporters Sans Frontières, have expressed some support for the measure, citing the need to repeal the Radio Broadcast Law of 1980 enacted by the National Reorganization Process, Argentina's last military government.

The acrimony between Cristina Kirchner's government and the national media was exacerbated by a series of lock-ins carried out by the truck drivers' union led by Pablo Moyano, son of Hugo Moyano, a close ally of the Kirchner government. During the lock in, the country's most widely circulated newspapers (Clarín and La Nación) were prevented by force and threats of violence from distributing papers to newsstands. On 7 November 2009, the Association of Newspaper Editors of Buenos Aires (AEDBA) issued a statement in which it claimed that the truck drivers' unions' actions had been the fiercest attack on the free circulation of newspapers the country had seen since its return to democratic rule in 1983.

In 2010 the Supreme Court of Argentina ruled that the judicial movement made by an opposition deputy who tried to suspend the new Media Law, which was approved by the National Congress, was illegal.
