= Julián Domínguez =

Argentine politician (born 1963)

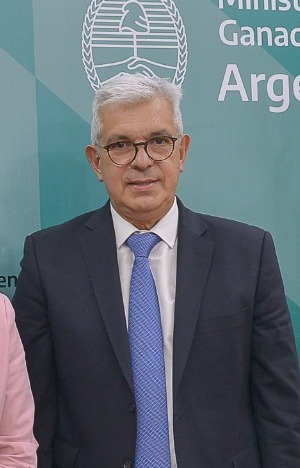
- Domínguez in 2022

Minister of Agriculture
- In office 20 September 2021 – 3 August 2022
- President: Alberto Fernández
- Preceded by: Luis Basterra
- Succeeded by: Juan José Bahillo (as Secretary of Agriculture)
- In office 1 October 2009 – 10 December 2011
- President: Cristina Fernández de Kirchner
- Preceded by: Carlos Cheppi (as Secretary of Agriculture)
- Succeeded by: Norberto Yahuar

President of the Chamber of Deputies
- In office 6 December 2011 – 10 December 2015
- Preceded by: Eduardo Fellner
- Succeeded by: Emilio Monzó

National Deputy
- In office 5 December 2011 – 4 December 2015
- Constituency: Buenos Aires

Provincial Deputy of Buenos Aires
- In office 10 December 2003 – 30 September 2009
- Constituency: Fourth Electoral Section

Mayor of Chacabuco
- In office 10 December 1995 – 10 December 1999
- Preceded by: Héctor Francolino
- Succeeded by: Horacio Recalde

Personal details
- Born: 24 November 1963 (age 62) Chacabuco, Buenos Aires
- Party: Justicialist Party
- Other political affiliations: Front for Victory (until 2019); Frente de Todos (since 2021)
- Spouse: Claudia Moreno
- Children: 5
- Education: University of Buenos Aires
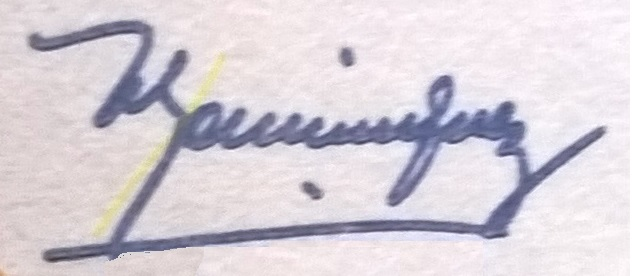
- Signature

Julián Andrés Domínguez (Spanish pronunciation: [xuˈljan anˈdɾez ðoˈmiŋɡes]; born 24 November 1963) is an Argentine politician of the Justicialist Party. He was twice Minister of Agriculture, in the cabinets of presidents Alberto Fernández (2021–2022) and Cristina Fernández de Kirchner (2009–2011).

From 2011 to 2015, he was President of the Argentine Chamber of Deputies.

== Early life and career ==
Domínguez was born in the Buenos Aires Province town of Chacabuco, located in the heart of the Pampas and the Argentine maize belt. His grandparents were smallholders, and made artisanal honey, jams, and cheeses. His mother, Nélida Olivetto, raised young Julián as a single mother, and worked at the grade school he attended. He enrolled at the University of Buenos Aires and entered Law School, though without ultimately earning a degree. He married Claudia Moreno, with whom he had four children and adopted a fifth. Domínguez entered public service in 1989 as head of the board of advisors of the Buenos Aires Province Social Security Institute. He later joined the national Ministry of Health under President Carlos Menem as chief youth policy advisor, and in 1993, was named chief policy advisor to Interior Minister (Home Secretary) Carlos Ruckauf. In 2013, he finished his degree in law at the University of Buenos Aires.

== Political career ==
=== Local and provincial politics ===
He returned to Chacabuco in 1994 and was elected intendente (mayor) the following year on the ruling Justicialist Party (Peronist) ticket. Domínguez was elected to the Lower House of Congress in 1999, but forfeited his seat following an offer for the post of provincial Public Works Minister by Ruckauf, who had been elected Governor of Buenos Aires. He was influential in the governor's 2001 decision to rescind the province's water service concession granted several years earlier to Azurix, a local Enron subsidiary. The precipitous resignation of President Fernando de la Rúa at the end of 2001 and his eventual replacement by a leading Peronist figure, Eduardo Duhalde, brought Domínguez to the Casa Rosada as the President's Assistant Chief of Staff. He served mainly in a parliamentary liaison capacity in this post, and the election of Néstor Kirchner to the Presidency in 2003 took Domínguez to an important Defense Ministry post, where he served as liaison between the Argentine Military and the remaining, civilian arms of the Argentine Government.

He was elected to the Buenos Aires Province Legislature in 2003, and his work with Ruckauf and Duhalde, both former governors who still wielded influence in the provincial capital, helped result in Domínguez's prompt election as the body's Justicialist Party caucus Whip. He became prominent in the Judiciary Committee, becoming its Chairman and the Vice President of the Lower House itself following his reelection in 2007.

=== Minister of Agriculture and later work ===
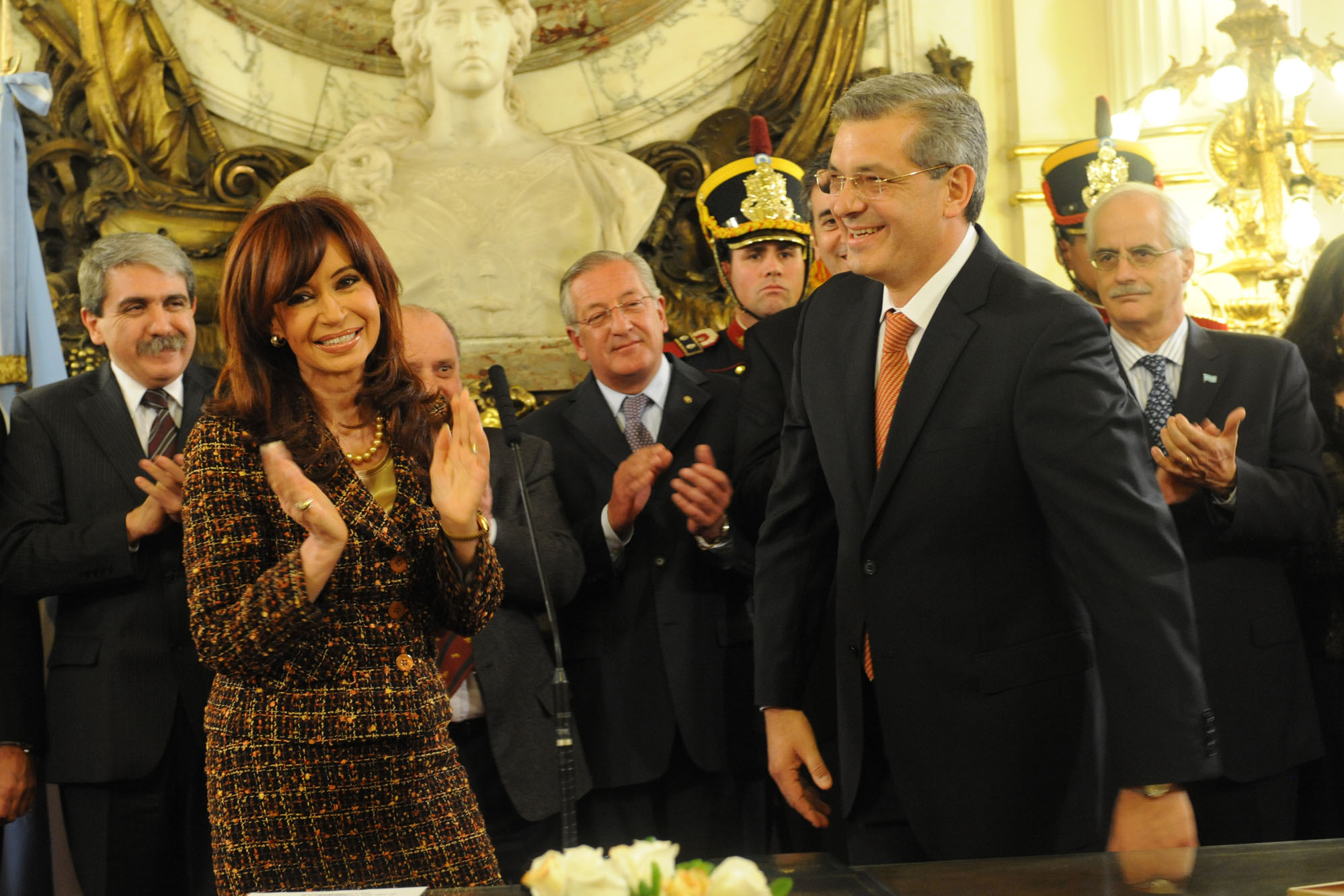
Domínguez following his swearing-in as Minister of Agriculture in 2009

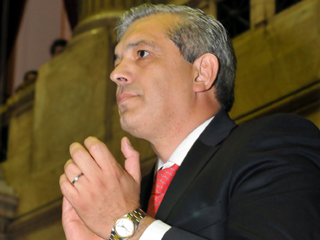
Julián Domínguez as President of the Chamber of Deputies

Fallout from the 2008 Argentine government conflict with the agricultural sector over a proposed rise in export tariffs led to a number of changes in the executive branch, including the creation that year of a Production Ministry and, on 30 September 2009, the reinstatement of the Agriculture Secretariat as a (cabinet-level) ministry, a prominence the post had not enjoyed since 1981. Supported by Presidential Chief of Staff Aníbal Fernández, Domínguez was tapped for the post and sworn in on 1 October. Pending, however, were improvements in strained relations between the center-left administration of President Cristina Kirchner and (among others) nation's important agrarian sector, whose leading figures approved of her decision to reinstate the Agriculture Ministry, but expressed skepticism at the appointment to the post of a legislator with no farming experience, and who had recently supported a hike in provincial farm income taxes.

Domínguez's tenure saw the federal government regain the initiative to some extent vis-à-vis the agrarian sector. The contentious entity regulating agricultural subsidies, ONCCA, was dissolved in 2011; and the proposed return to a Federal Grain Board (such as the one prevailing in Argentina between 1935 and the creation of ONCCA in 1996), as well as the revival of the Federal Agrarian Council of provincial officials dealing with the sector, succeeded in dividing the powerful agrarian lobby round table, the Mesa de Enlace.

He was elected to the Argentine Chamber of Deputies in 2011, he was named president of the body on 6 December.

In 2021, he was once again appointed as Minister of Agriculture, this time under President Alberto Fernández in replacement of Luis Basterra. Domínguez's appointment was part of a cabinet reshuffle following the government's poor showings in the 2021 legislative primary elections.

Political offices
Preceded by Héctor Francolino	Mayor of Chacabuco; 1995–1999	Succeeded by Horacio Recalde
Preceded by Carlos Cheppi as Secretary of Agriculture	Minister of Agriculture; 2009–2011	Succeeded by Norberto Yahuar
Preceded by Eduardo Fellner	President of the Chamber of Deputies; 2011–2015	Succeeded by Emilio Monzó
Preceded by Luis Basterra	Minister of Agriculture; 2021–2022	Succeeded by Juan José Bahillo as Secretary of Agriculture
