= Luis Basterra =

Argentinian politician

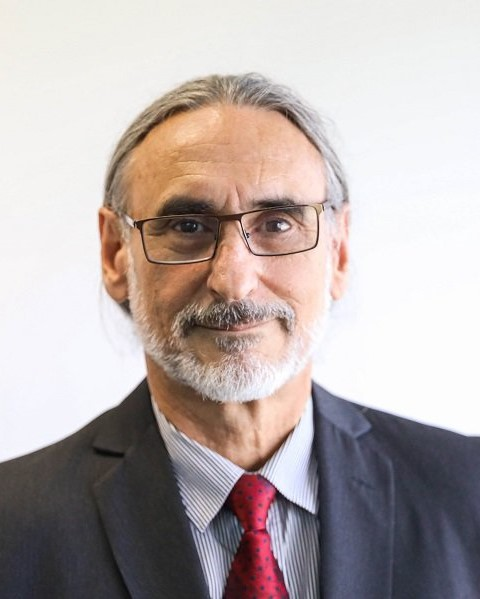

National Deputy
- Incumbent
- Assumed office 10 December 2023
- Constituency: Formosa
- In office 10 December 2011 – 10 December 2019
- Constituency: Formosa

Minister of Agriculture
- In office 10 December 2019 – 20 September 2021
- President: Alberto Fernández
- Preceded by: Luis Miguel Etchevehere
- Succeeded by: Julián Domínguez

Vice President of INTA
- In office 13 October 2009 – 10 December 2011
- President: Carlos Casamiquela
- Preceded by: Amadeo Nicora
- Succeeded by: Francisco Anglesio

Personal details
- Born: 14 October 1958 (age 68) Resistencia, Chaco, Argentina
- Party: Justicialist Party
- Other political affiliations: Frente de Todos (since 2019); Front for Victory (until 2019)
- Education: National University of the Northeast

Luis Eugenio Basterra (Spanish pronunciation: [ˈlwiz ewˈxenjo βasˈtera]; born 14 October 1958) is an Argentine agricultural engineer and politician. He was the country's Minister of Agriculture, Livestock and Fisheries from 10 December 2019 to 20 September 2021, in the cabinet of President Alberto Fernández.

Since 2023, he has been a member of the Argentine Chamber of Deputies representing Formosa Province. He previously held the same position from 2011 to 2019. Basterra also served as vice-president of the National Agricultural Technology Institute (INTA) from 2009 to 2011 and as Minister of Production of Formosa Province from 2003 to 2009 in the administration of Governor Gildo Insfrán.

== Early life and education ==
Basterra was born in Resistencia, Chaco Province, in 1958. In 1988 he graduated as an agricultural engineer from the National University of the Northeast (UNNE). In his youth he was a member of the Popular Socialist Party, but later joined the ranks of the Justicialist Party when he moved to Formosa.

== Political career ==
=== Provincial politics and work in INTA ===
In 1996 he was appointed Undersecretary of Employment in the Formosa Ministry of Economy, Public Works and Services by Governor Gildo Insfrán; he was in the position until 2000, when he was appointed to the Undersecretariat of Commerce and Investment within the same ministry. In 2003 Insfrán appointed him Minister of Production of the province; Basterra held this post until 2009. In 2009 he also briefly served as president of the Consejo Federal de Medio Ambiente (COFEMA).

From 13 October 2009 to 10 December 2011 Basterra served as vice president of the National Agricultural Technology Institute of Argentina (INTA). During his tenure at INTA, he sought to promote and expand the reach of aquaculture in Argentina.

=== Congressional terms ===
At the 2011 general election Basterra was the 3rd candidate in the Front for Victory (FPV) list to the Chamber of Deputies in Formosa; the FPV won nearly 80% of the vote and Basterra was elected. Shortly after taking office he was elected by the FPV majority to preside over the Agriculture Commission in the lower chamber of Congress.

In 2015 he was re-elected to the Chamber, this time placing first in the FPV party list in Formosa. He was re-elected a third time in 2019.

=== Minister of Agriculture ===
On 10 December 2019, Basterra was appointed Minister of Agriculture, Livestock and Fisheries by President Alberto Fernández as part of the new cabinet of Argentina, succeeding Luis Miguel Etchevehere. Following the government's poor showings in the 2021 legislative primary elections, Basterra was replaced by Julián Domínguez as part of a cabinet reshuffle.

== Personal life ==
Basterra is a vegetarian.

Political offices
Preceded by Amadeo Nicora	Minister of Production of Formosa; 2003–2009	Succeeded by Raúl Omar Quintana
Preceded by Amadeo Nicora	Vice President of INTA; 2009–2011	Succeeded by Francisco Anglesio
Preceded by Luis Miguel Etchevehere	Minister of Agriculture; 2019–2021	Succeeded by Julián Domínguez
