= History of agriculture in Argentina =

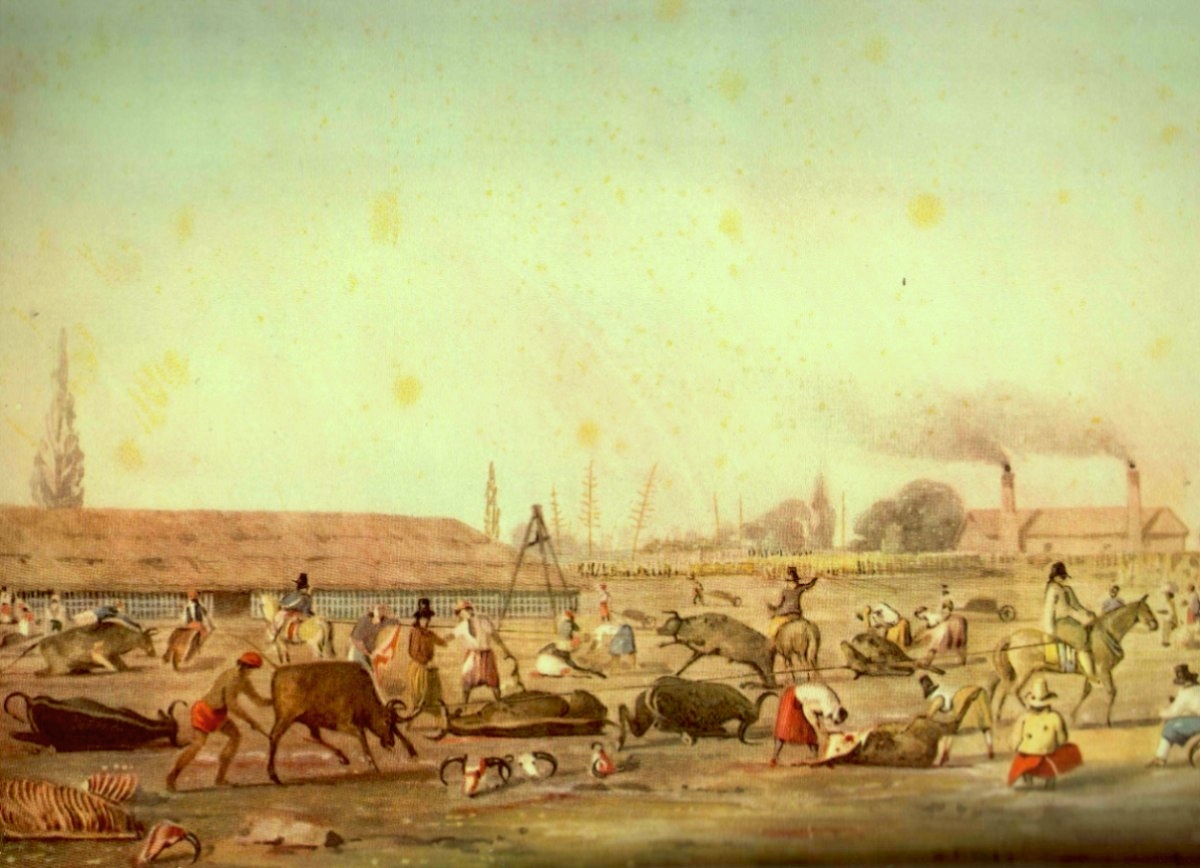
Impression of a Buenos Aires slaughterhouse by Charles Pellegrini, 1829.

Since its formal organization as a national entity in the second half of the 17th century, Argentina followed an agricultural and livestock export model of development with a large concentration of crops in the fertile Pampas, particularly in and around Buenos Aires Province, as well as in the littoral of the Paraná and Uruguay Rivers. Between 1880 and 1930, the country witnessed remarkable economic advancement largely propelled by the exportation of beef and grain. Largely limited to stock-raising activities and centered on the export of cattle hides and wool, Argentine agriculture languished during the colonial era and well into the 19th century. Argentina's historical trajectory has been significantly shaped by the evolution of its agricultural sector.

Aside from the yerba mate harvest in the northeast, attempts to develop intensive agriculture suffered setbacks due to internal strife and lack of skill and machinery. The pastoral economy was initially constructed around wool exports.

== Nineteenth-century ==
Initially characterized by subsistence farming and small-scale pastoralism, the country experienced a dramatic expansion of agricultural frontiers driven by European immigration. The fertile Pampas region became the epicenter of this agricultural boom, particularly suited for extensive livestock grazing and later for cereal cultivation. Cattle ranching emerged as a dominant industry, fueled by the vast grasslands of the Pampas.

The first shorthorn bull arrived in the 1820s. Hereford cattle followed in 1862, Aberdeen Angus in the 1870s, and Holstein-Friesian cattle in 1880, which led to the development of the Holando-Argentino. Argentina was seen as particularly suitable for cattle ranching and by 1920 it was the most important beef-producing country in the world. In the 1930s more than 90% of the beef exports went to the United Kingdom.

The development of a cohesive state after 1852 led to the 1868 creation of Argentina's first Institute of Agronomy and the 1875 arrival of the first intact grain shipment from Argentina to Great Britain sparked a wave of local investment in cultivation and silos and British investment in railways and finance.

During the late 19th century, agriculture was not perceived by Argentine producers as a profitable business compared to livestock farming. In 1873, German naturalist Hermann Burmeister conducted a study concluding that, due to the heat and dryness of the soils, wheat would never grow in the Pampa.

The 1876 development of refrigerated beef shipping, likewise, led to the modernization of that sector.

== Twentieth century ==
The acreage devoted to wheat grew from 3.2 million in 1890 to 15 million in 1910 but it was still less significant than ranching.

American companies moved into the Argentinean trade in 1907 and by 1918 they had 68.1% of the export market.

By the 1920s, Argentine exports reached US$1 billion annually, of which 99% was agricultural. Maize and wheat had, by then, largely overshadowed beef production and exports. In 1926 there were 17 abattoirs, capable of slaughtering 27,500 cattle, 50,000 sheep, and 4,000 pigs daily. Cattle were inspected twice before slaughter and once afterward. 300 veterinary surgeons and 300 assistants inspected the cattle exports

Agriculture was a major portion of the Argentine economy until about 1930. From the late 19th century to the 1930s agriculture was based in the fertile Pampas region. Argentina's agricultural success grew the economy and eventually surpassed other successful countries, including Australia, the USA, Canada, and Brazil.

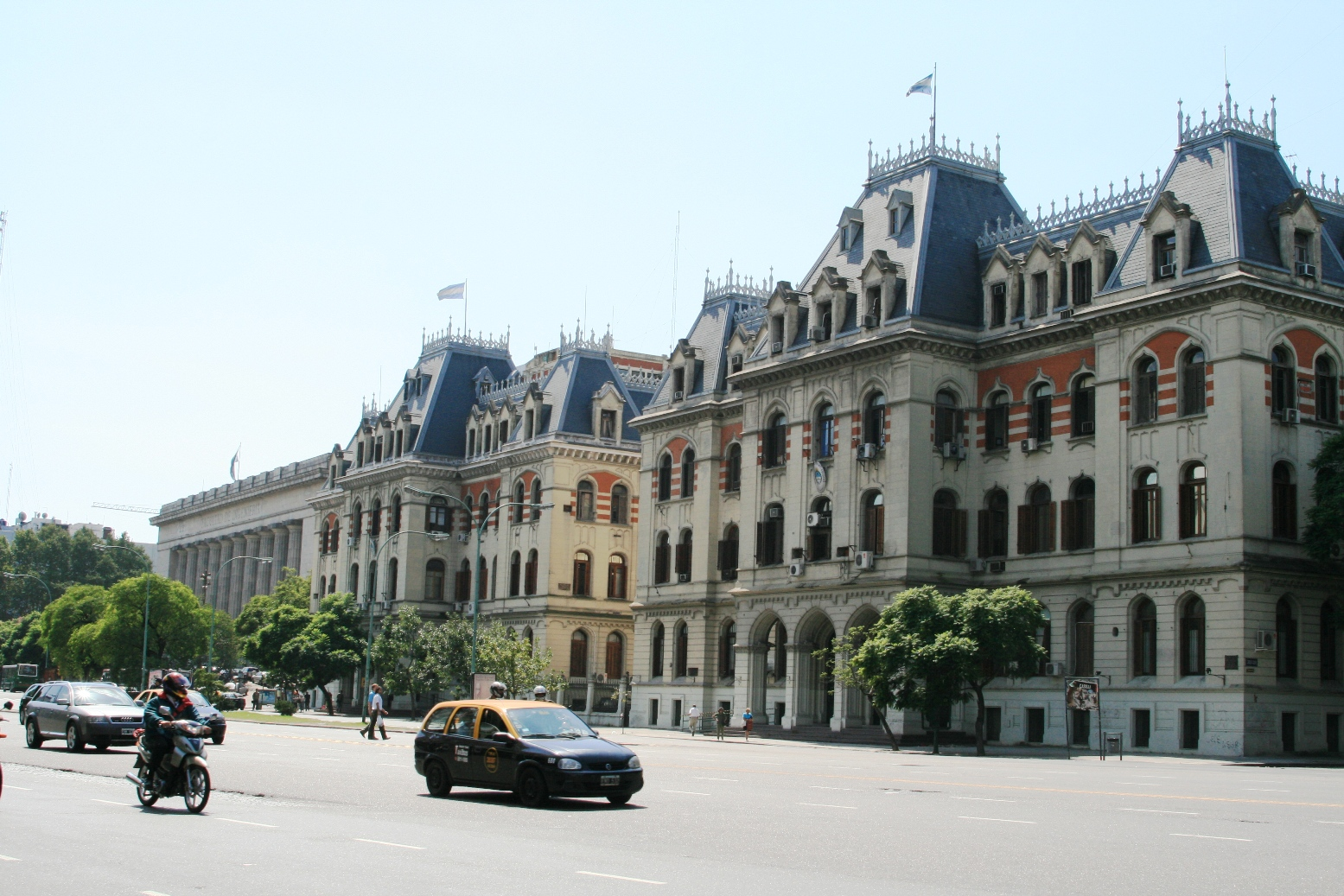
The Secretariat of Agriculture headquarters in Buenos Aires.

These developments were accompanied by a wave of European immigration and investments in education and infrastructure, all of which nearly reinvented Argentine society. Agricultural development, in turn, led to the first meaningful industrial growth, which, during the 1920s, was mainly centered on food processing and increasingly involved United States capital.

By the time it reached 1930 The Great Depression had hit, and production was starting to lag. Limits of the Pampas were also starting to surface. After 1930 Argentina started to lag behind its competitors. The Depression was especially severe in the agricultural sector, with growth slowing down while in other countries crop yields rose exponentially.

Agricultural exports provided the Argentine Treasury with generous surpluses during both World Wars and helped finance a boom in machinery and consumer goods imports between the wars and after 1945. The creation of a single grain purchaser (the IAPI) by President Juan Perón produced mixed results, often shortchanging growers even as it benefited them with investments in infrastructure, machinery, and pest control. The rise of Peronism further marginalized the traditional landowning elite, stripping them of their political control. Subsequently, successive administrations, following Perón's ousting in 1955, prioritized import substitution industrialization over agricultural interests, viewing it as pivotal for the nation's future. Consequently, agricultural groups struggled to regain their former influence in economic policymaking. Since 1960, according to Viglizzo:

Agriculture expanded during the last 50 years from the Pampas to NW Argentina at the expense of natural forests and rangelands. In parallel, productivity was boosted through the increasing application of external inputs, modern technology, and management practices.

Policies friendly to industrial investment during Arturo Frondizi's tenure led to the establishment of FIAT and John Deere farm machinery makers locally, spurring further modernization, as did accelerated rural roadbuilding and electrification programs during the 1960s. Cost-cutting measures by the Juan Carlos Onganía regime led to the closure of 11 large sugar mills in 1966, however, even as agriculture generally continued to grow.

Domestic austerity policies pursued by the last dictatorship and Raúl Alfonsín's government led to record trade surpluses during much of the 1976–90 era, led by agricultural exports and, notably, the sudden boom in soybean cultivation, which displaced sunflower seeds as the leading oilseed crop in 1977. A severe shortage of domestic credit hampered the sector somewhat, however, as growing harvests soon outstripped transport and storage capacity.

A tie of the Argentine peso to the U.S. dollar implemented by economist Domingo Cavallo in 1991 reduced export competitiveness somewhat, though the resulting stability led to record investments in agricultural infrastructure and led to strong growth in harvests during the late 1990s. These trends were accompanied by the federal approval of GMO crops in 1995. A devaluation of the peso in 2002 and a sustained rise in commodity prices since has further encouraged the sector, leading to record production and exports, helping finance record public works spending through export tariffs, a centerpiece of Néstor and Cristina Kirchner's economic policies. These, in turn, became a point of contention when President Cristina Kirchner advanced a hike in export tariffs, leading to the 2008 Argentine government conflict with the agricultural sector; the tariff increase was defeated in the Senate when Vice President Julio Cobos cast an unexpected, tie-breaking vote against the measure.

== See also ==
- Agriculture in Argentina
- Patagonian sheep farming boom
