= Norberto Yauhar =

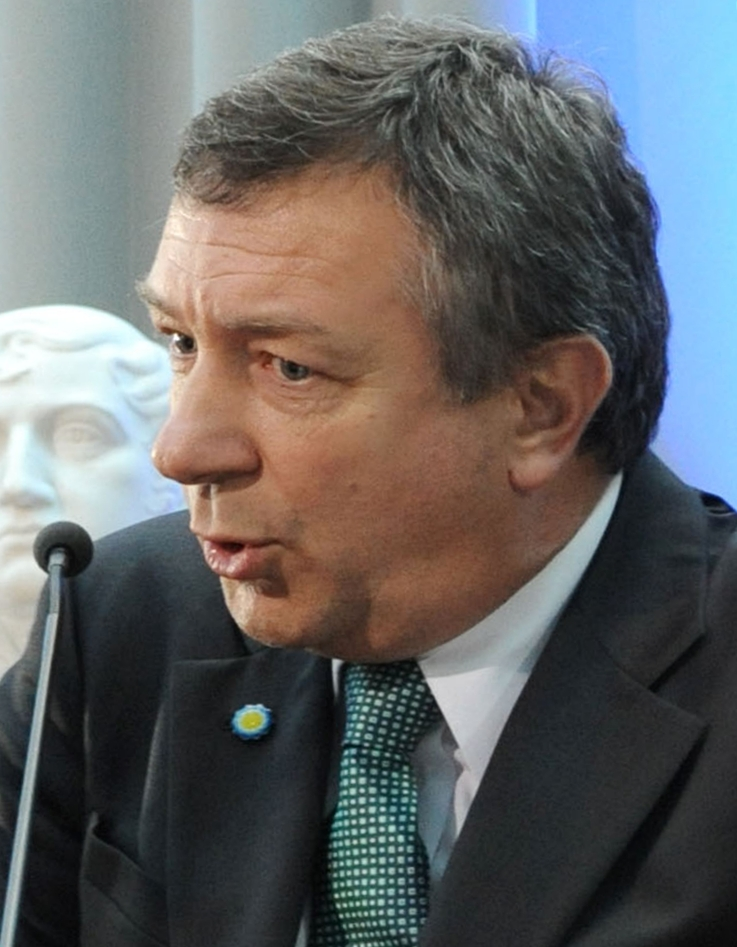

Minister of Agriculture
- In office December 10, 2011 – November 20, 2013
- President: Cristina Fernández de Kirchner
- Preceded by: Julián Domínguez
- Succeeded by: Carlos Casamiquela

Undersecretary of Fisheries
- In office November 8, 2008 – December 10, 2011
- President: Cristina Fernández de Kirchner
- Preceded by: Gerardo Nieto

Personal details
- Born: December 7, 1960 (age 65) General Roca, Río Negro

Norberto Gustavo Yauhar (born December 7, 1960) is an Argentine politician. He was designated Minister of Agriculture by President Cristina Fernández de Kirchner in 2011, serving in the post until 2013.

== Life and times ==
Yauhar was born in General Roca, Río Negro, in 1960. His family were cattle ranchers in rural Los Menucos, though he himself would spend much of his life in Trelew, in neighboring Chubut Province.

He entered politics as a member of the Justicialist Party, and would later work with Trelew-area Congressman Mario das Neves. Das Neves appointed Yauhar to the powerful Ministry of Coordination upon taking office as Governor of Chubut in 2003, and Yauhar played key roles in advancing the governor's main initiatives. These included the renegotiation of royalties from the province's lucrative oil and gas sector, as well as the establishment of the Chubut Neighborhood Projection party, whose endorsement of das Neves' 2007 reelection campaign gave the governor an absolute majority in the Provincial Legislature.

Yauhar's rapport with Das Neves deteriorated early in his second term, however. He was opposed to das Neves' break with Kirchnerism (with whose support the governor had been reelected), and in turn, earned the enmity of the governor's son, Pablo das Neves. Yauhar resigned in September, and was offered a Federal Government post as Coordinator of Public Enterprises for Public Works Minister Julio de Vido. He worked well with de Vido, and with the latter's support was appointed Secretary of Fisheries in November.

The largely autonomous Fisheries Secretariat became a part of the newly established Ministry of Agriculture in 2009. The fishing sector in Argentina had been declining for years as a result of overexploitation and high discard rates; the important Argentine hake catch in particular had declined by around 70% since the mid-1990s. Yauhar offered the commercial fishing lobby the lifting of a long-standing regulation requiring the use of special fishing nets designed to free juvenile hake, citing widespread non-compliance. This concession was granted in return for stricter catch share quotas and government monitoring of fishing vessels. The difficulty of monitoring vessel movements along the vast Argentine Sea made implementation of this latter policy unfeasible, however, and by April 2010, Yauhar admitted the failure of this new policy from the point of view of conservation; the lifting of special net requirement proved a boon to the hake fishing industry, however, which saw its catch double to around 800,000 tons in the interim. The Director of the Greenpeace Oceans Campaign, Milko Schvartzman, cited lax enforcement of the catch quotas as another factor.

Yauhar ran for mayor of his adopted city, Trelew, in his splinter New Peronist Space ticket in March 2011, but was defeated by the rival Peronist candidate endorsed by Governor das Neves, Máximo Pérez Catán. Following the election in October of Agriculture Minister Julián Domínguez to the Argentine Chamber of Deputies, Yauhar was designated to the post by President Cristina Kirchner. He was widely expected to continue his predecessor's policy of rapprochement with the agrarian sector, whose relationship with the federal government had suffered in the wake of a 2008 dispute over a proposed hike in export taxes.
