= Carlos Cheppi =

Argentine politician

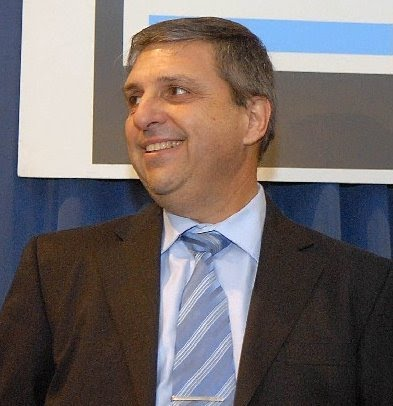

Argentine Ambassador to Venezuela
- In office 10 December 2011 – 10 December 2015
- Preceded by: Alicia Castro

Secretary of Agriculture of Argentina
- In office July 2008 – August 2009
- Preceded by: Javier de Urquiza
- Succeeded by: Julián Domínguez

Personal details
- Born: 1955 (age 69–70); Mar del Plata, Buenos Aires Province, Argentina
- Political party: Front for Victory

Carlos Alberto Cheppi (born 1955) is an Argentine politician who served as Argentina's ambassador to Venezuela.

Cheppi graduated in agronomy from the National University of Mar del Plata in 1981 and joined the National Agricultural Technology Institute two years later. He rose to become the institute's president in 2003. He replaced Javier de Urquiza as Minister of Agriculture in July 2008 during the Argentine government's conflict with the agricultural sector. After leaving the post the following year, Cheppi was appointed ambassador plenipotentiary in the Ministry of Foreign Affairs. In 2011 he stood unsuccessfully for mayor of Mar del Plata. He was appointed ambassador to Venezuela in December 2011 until December 2015, when Mauricio Macri took office as president.
