= Carlos Casamiquela =

Argentine agricultural engineer (1948–2020)

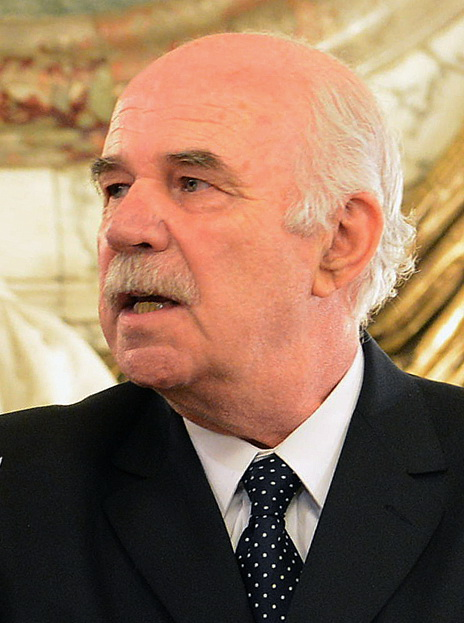

Minister of Agriculture
- In office 20 November 2013 – 10 December 2015
- President: Cristina Fernández de Kirchner
- Preceded by: Norberto Yauhar
- Succeeded by: Ricardo Buryaile

President of the National Agricultural Technology Institute
- In office 13 October 2009 – 20 November 2013
- Preceded by: Carlos Paz
- Succeeded by: Francisco Anglesio

Personal details
- Born: June 9, 1948 Viedma, Río Negro, Argentina
- Died: September 12, 2020 (aged 72)
- Education: National University of La Plata
- Profession: Agronomist

Carlos Horacio Casamiquela (9 June 1948 – 12 September 2020) was an Argentine agricultural engineer and public official. He was appointed Minister of Agriculture of Argentina in November 2013, replacing Norberto Yauhar.

== Biography ==
Born in Viedma, Río Negro Province, Casamiquela studied Agricultural Engineering at the National University of La Plata, graduating in 1973. He also held degrees in Local Economic Development from the National University of General San Martín and the Autonomous University of Madrid, Spain. He joined the National Agricultural Technology Institute (INTA) in 1974 as a topsoil specialist, and in 1980 returned to his home province by way of a transfer to INTA's Río Negro Upper Valley Experimental Station. His work as researcher focused on irrigation needs for the orchard-rich Upper Valley, and he went on to direct the facility between 1984 and 1990. He authored the "Project for the Restructuring of Fruticulture in Argentina" (1986), among 15 published research papers.

Casamiquela was promoted to the post of INTA Regional Director for North Patagonia in 1990. He remained in the post until September 2003, when he was appointed Vice President of SENASA, the food safety regulatory office. The revival of the Agriculture Ministry as a cabinet-level office in 2009, and the appointment of Buenos Aires Province Legislator Julián Domínguez to the post, was followed by Casamiquela's appointment as President of the INTA by Minister Domínguez in October of that year. Casamiquela oversaw the continued revitalization of INTA, which grew from 3,500 employees in 2003 to 7,200 by 2010, while focusing its efforts on the promotion of local agriculture and small farmers (who employ 54% of all agricultural workers in Argentina). INTA's Prohuerta program, launched in 2005, provided assistance to 630,000 market gardens and 148,000 small farms by 2013, as well as 19,000 rural families in Haiti. Other highlights during his tenure include an instructional program for intensive agriculture methods initiated in South Africa, and the approval for import by China of two of INTA's GMO soy and one GMO maize varieties.

A cabinet reshuffle by President Cristina Fernández de Kirchner in late 2013 led to the resignation of Agriculture Minister Norberto Yauhar and his replacement by Casamiquela. His nomination was welcomed by the head of the influential Argentine Rural Confederations (CRA), Rubén Ferrero, who remarked that "we've know him for a long time, and he's knowledgeable about the problems facing agriculture in Argentina; we hope he'll be given the necessary latitude to implement the policy changes we've been advocating for some time now."

He died from COVID-19 on 12 September 2020, during the COVID-19 pandemic in Argentina.
