= Roberto Vignati =

Argentinian businessman

- Born: March 28, 1979 (age 46); Rosario, Santa Fe Province, Argentina
- Occupation: Businessman
- Known for: Allegations of corruptions through dubious export contracts

Roberto Vignati is an Argentinian businessman who gained prominence in 2014 when it was revealed that his firm Bioart SA had been selected by the Argentinian government to act as the sole intermediary in exports of rice and corn to Venezuela, and that it had made inordinate profits on the arrangement.

Media in both countries noted that Vignati enjoyed close ties to the administration of Argentinian President Cristina Fernández de Kirchner and that, prior to the export deal, which had gone into effect in 2013, his firm had been involved only in the retail sale of fertilizer and seeds.

== Early life and education ==
Vignati is from the town of Arteaga in the department of Caseros, province of Santa Fe.

Clarín has stated that according to some sources, Vignati's father fought on the Peronist left in the 1970, and Vignati used that fact to win the friendship of Planning Minister Julio De Vido.

== Career ==
=== Bioart SA ===
Bioart SA was founded in 2009, but did not register as a grain wholesaler until November 2013. On paper, its owners were Vignati's sisters María Isabel and María Eugenia, but he was the company's public representative.

Vignati traveled to Caracas in February 2013 with Julio De Vido, Argentina's Minister of Planning, with the intention of offering the use of silos owned by Marisa, a firm in Arteaga owned by Vignati's mother's family. The apparent result of the visit, however, was that Bioart became a central player in grain export deals that would attract a great deal of criticism.

In May 2013, Argentina and Venezuela signed an agreement for the export of 80,000 tons of unprocessed rice. The governor of Entre Rios, Sergio Urribarri, said at the time that the sales would be carried out by rice farmers themselves, without intermediaries. He promised that the price charged to Venezuela would yield a profit, but the Pan Am Post later commented that “what rice producers did not know...was that the 'profitability'...would actually be for the middlemen, and not Argentina’s rice producers.” The alleged “middlemen” in the report were Vignati and his siblings, whose firm, Bioart SA, was granted sole permission by the Argentinian government to export rice to Venezuela. The firm ended up exporting the grain at an approximately 30% profit.

The directors of Fedenar, the national federation of Argentinian rice producers, warned in October 2013 of Bioart's intrusion in negotiations with Venezuela for rice exports. In January 2014, Fedenar filed complaints about Bioart's involvement, to no avail, with Argentinian Cabinet Chief Jorge Capitanich and Agriculture Minister Carlos Casamiquela. A complaint to Argentina's Ministry of Domestic Trade, which grants export permits, also had no effect. Later in January, Fedenar appealed to Urribarri, who promised to bring up the issue with President Cristina Fernandez de Kirchner; but nothing came to fruition. Fedenar complained that Bioart was not even a rice producer, questioning how a firm founded five years ago with no rice and corn export experience could gain such a lucrative deal.

In March 2014, the rice sector reacted with “astonishment” at Bioart's role in the export of rice. On June 16, 2014, 27,500 tons of rice, worth over U.S. $16 million, were shipped from the port of San Pedro.

In accordance with agreement with the Argentinian government, Bioart also had handled the export of more than 40,000 tons of corn to Venezuela at prices that were almost 80% higher than market value. The first shipment of corn took place on February 28, 2014, only fifteen days after Vignati met with María Gabriela Chávez, the daughter of Hugo Chávez, at the Argentinian embassy in Caracas. A second corn shipment took place on April 15, 2014.

=== Ecuador ===
Vignati was involved in an agricultural development project in Ecuador that began in September 2010 with talks involving senior officials in that country's government. Vignati's business representative in Ecuador, Gaston Duzac, told Ecuador's Minister of Production, Santiago Leon, that the initiative had been developed by Vignati's family firm Marisa, which Duzac identified as a subsidiary of Agroexportadora SA. The latter firm is officially owned by Jorge Bulgarelli, a lawyer who has longtime personal and business connections with the Vignati family. Duzac received an $800,000 loan from the Ecuadoran state bank, Cofiec, for which he turned out to have no guarantees; when Ecuadoran courts began to investigate the loan, they discovered that Duzac had fled the country with the money.

== Other business activity ==
Vignati owns several other businesses. Caisa SRL sells agricultural supplies in Cruz Alta, a town near Arteaga. Inarg SA, a silo and machinery manufacturing firm, was established in April 2014. Rosart Desarollo SA, a real-estate firm, was founded in June 2014. In Bell Ville, Vignati owns a stud farm called Juan Antonio, which has over 40 thoroughbred race horses. In addition, as of July 2014, Vignati was still managing a sports club in Arteaga.

== Political activities ==
In addition to having expressed “deep admiration” on social networks for Néstor and Cristina Kirchner as well as for Hugo Chávez, Vignati participated in the 2013 presidential campaign of Nicolas Maduro of Venezuela.

== Allegations of corruption ==
On July 7, 2014, Clarín published a long article in which it revealed that Bioart SA, which it described as “a dubious company with ties to power,” had been exporting rice and corn from Argentina to Venezuela at intentionally inflated prices in accordance with a deal arranged by the Argentinian government. Clarín also noted the involvement in the deal of María Gabriela Chávez, Julio De Vido, and Argentina's ambassador to Venezuela, Carlos Cheppi. Clarín quoted the Cámara de Industriales Arroceros de Entre Ríos, a rice-growers' group, as saying that the Bioart deal was benefiting “a few entrepreneurs” in Argentina while hurting many other Argentinians. According to Clarín, the rice industry was “furious” over the deal, under which they were paid a far lower rate for rice sold to Venezuela than their counterparts in Uruguay and Brazil.

Clarín's July 7 report identified Vignati as the “visible face” of Bioart, and said that he traveled often to Venezuela, had top connections with politicians, and had experienced significant financial gain.

Clarín's revelations attracted widespread attention. De Vido rejected all accusations of corruption, denying that Bioart S.A or any Vignati family members had any business connections to him. He continued also denying any connection to the Venezuelan government.

The Spanish daily El Mundo reported that María Gabriela Chávez, owing to her apparent role in arranging the Bioart rice deal, had been dubbed the “queen of rice” on social media.

Clarín reported on July 28, 2014, that although the selection of Bioart as the sole intermediary in the sale of rice to Venezuela could be considered an instance of anti-competitive practices, as defined by the National Commission for Protection of Competition (CNDC), that organization was not likely to criticize the arrangement, because the president of the CNDC, Ricardo Napolitani, is a close friend of Vignati's and has been referred to as an obedient servant of the Kirchner dynasty. Indeed, far from criticizing Vignati, Napolitani was his “protector,” Clarín was told by one source. Clarín also noted links between Vignati and other individuals in the Kirchner circle.

=== Corruption charges ===
In mid July 2014, opposition Venezuelan legislators Abelardo Díaz and Homero Ruíz filed corruption and fraud charges with the Public Prosecutor of Caracas in connection with Vignati's inflated prices. They presented the Prosecutor with evidence of “unbridled corruption” and influence peddling in Vignati's sale not only of rice and corn but also of agricultural machinery, power plants, and black beans to Venezuela. The legislators pointed out that Bioart had only five employees in 2012 and that, until its role in grain sales to Venezuela, had officially been involved only in the retail sale of fertilizer and seeds. The legislators also asked the prosecutor to investigate María Gabriela Chávez and former Food Minister Felix Osorio and to ask for Cheppi to be recalled as ambassador.

On July 29, 2014, Clarín reported that Vignati was not only exporting rice and corn to Venezuela at highly inflated prices, but had also acted as an intermediary in the export of agricultural machinery from Argentina to Venezuela, via Bioart SA and another firm, Acoplados El Grillo. Clarín noted that El Grillo, based in Arrecifes, was officially owned by Jorge Bulgarelli, the lawyer of María Eugenia Vignati, and that Roberto Vignati had earlier been involved with Bulgarelli in his ultimately scandalous effort to do business in Ecuador. Clarín also pointed out that Ricardo Rodriguez Miranda, president of Pedro Camejo, a company created by Chávez in 2007 to further Venezuela's agricultural mechanization, had known Vignati since 2008, when Rodriguez had worked for another Venezuela state company, Legumes Alba SA, and had approved contracts with Marisa, the silo firm owned by Vignati's mother's family.

=== Kirchner ties ===
On September 8, 2014, Los Andes reported that three people who knew Roberto Vignati said he had been awarded the role as grain-sales intermediary due to his close family ties with the Kirchners. Los Andes further noted that despite the controversy, Bioart had received “official permission to export another boatload of corn” to Venezuela. The precise amount of the new shipment would be 46,957 tons; the price was not made public.
