= Vignati =

Vignati (pronounced [viɲˈɲaːti]) is an Italian surname from Lombardy, derived from the town of Vignate. Notable people with the surname include:

- Pierangelo Vignati (born 1970), Italian paralympic cyclist
- Roberto Vignati (born 1979), Argentinian businessman
- Stefano Vignati (born 1965), Italian conductor

== See also ==
- Vignato
- Vignatti
