= Ministry of Agriculture (Argentina) =

Former government ministry of Argentina

Ministry of Agriculture, Livestock and Fisheries
- Ministerio de Agricultura, Ganadería y Pesca
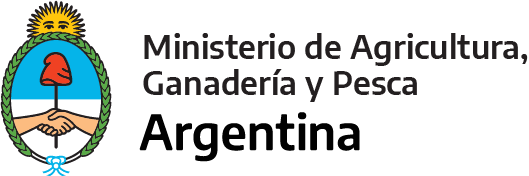

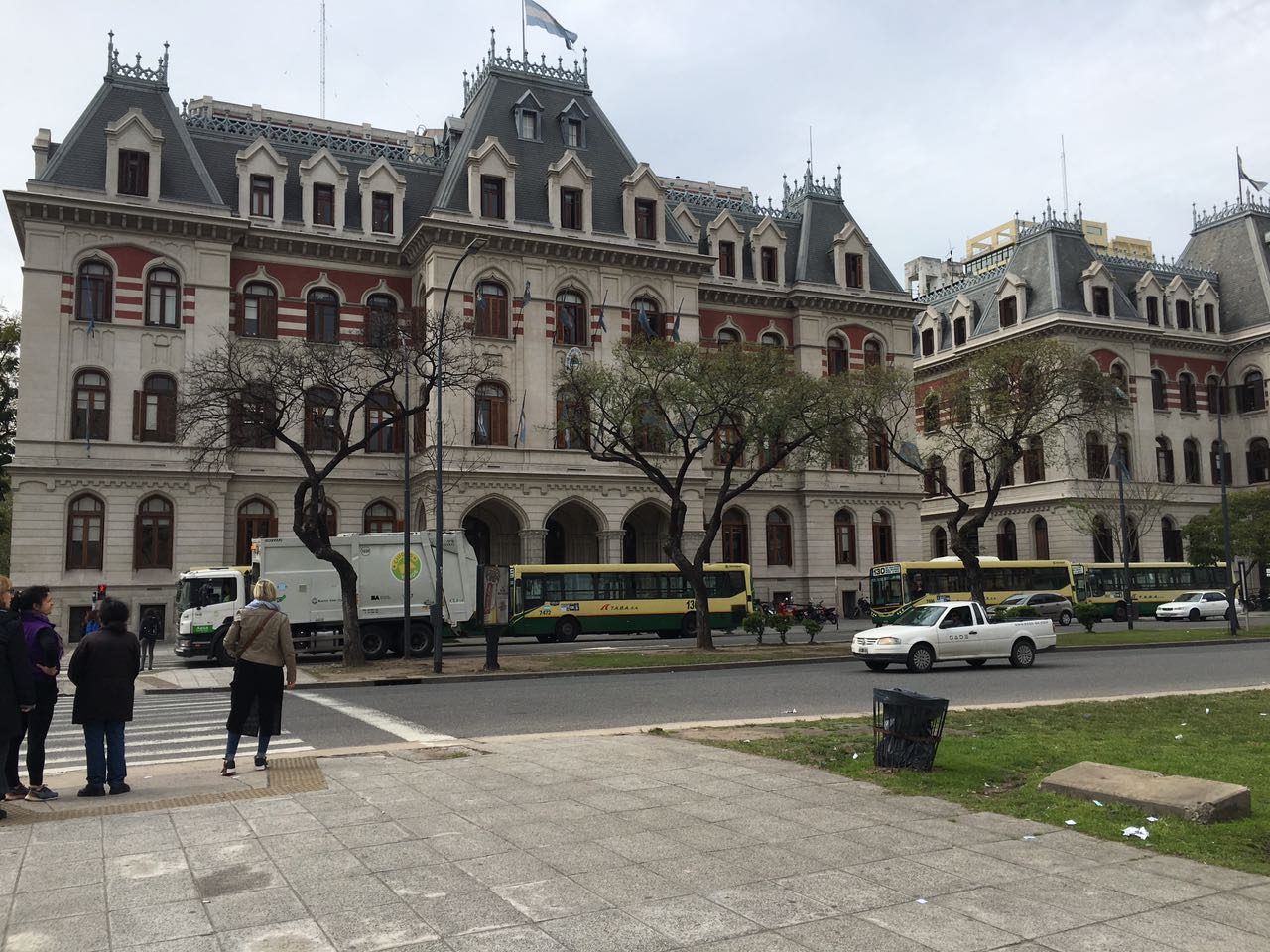
- Headquarters of the Ministry in Buenos Aires

Ministry overview
- Formed: 1898
- Preceding Ministry: National Department of Agriculture
- Dissolved: August 2022; 4 years ago
- Jurisdiction: Government of Argentina
- Headquarters: Av. Paseo Colón 922, Buenos Aires
- Annual budget: $17,278,000 (2018)
- Minister responsible: Julián Domínguez

The Ministry of Agriculture, Livestock and Fisheries (Spanish: Ministerio de Agricultura, Ganadería y Pesca) of Argentina, commonly known simply as the Ministry of Agriculture, was a ministry of the national executive power that oversaw production, commerce and health regulations in the agricultural, livestock and fishing industries.

The Ministry of Agriculture was one of the oldest portfolios in the Argentine government, having existed – under various names and incarnations – since 1898, when it was created by President Julio Argentino Roca.

The ministry was dissolved in August 2022 through decree n° 451 by president Alberto Fernández, turning it into a secretariat under supervision of the Ministry of Economy.

== History ==
The Ministry of Agriculture of Argentina was first established in 1898 through Law 3727 enacted by President Julio Argentino Roca following the 1898 constitutional reform; the first minister responsible was Emilio Frers, a lawyer and businessman and member of the Sociedad Rural Argentina. The government's agricultural policies had previously been co-ordinated by the National Department of Agriculture, a subdivision of the Ministry of the Interior established by President Domingo Faustino Sarmiento in 1871. The Ministry of Agriculture maintained its ministerial status and autonomy until 1958, when it was reorganized into the Secretariat of Agriculture and Livestock within the Ministry of Economy by President Arturo Frondizi.

The portfolio briefly regained ministerial status during the de facto administrations of presidents Alejandro Lanusse (1972–1973) and Roberto Viola (1981), otherwise remaining a subdivision of the Ministry of Economy (with the exception of the 2002–2003 presidency of Eduardo Duhalde, during which it was a secretariat of the Ministry of Production).

In 2009 the secretariat was once again elevated to ministerial level and was given the responsibilities of the fisheries secretariat by President Cristina Fernández de Kirchner, under the name of Ministry of Agriculture, Livestock, Fisheries and Food; its first minister was Julián Domínguez. The Ministry retained its name and responsibilities during the remainder of Fernández de Kirchner's presidency, until it was renamed as Ministry of Agroindustry during the presidency of Mauricio Macri (2015–2019), with Ricardo Buryaile as minister.

On 5 September 2018 the ministry was briefly reorganized as a secretariat of the Ministry of Production once again as part of a large-scale cabinet reshuffle which reduced the number of ministries from 22 to 11. The ministry quickly regained its status on 2 August 2019, when it was given its current name of Ministry of Agriculture, Livestock and Fisheries.

== Attributions ==
The attributions and responsibilities of the Ministry of Agriculture, Livestock and Fisheries are specified in Article 20 of the current Law of Ministries (Ley de Ministerios), published in 2019. According to this law, the Ministry is in charge of intervening in the establishment of tariffs and export and tariff refunds in the areas within its jurisdiction; defining the national state's commerce policy on agriculture, livestock and fisheries; promoting, organizing and participating in agriculture-related exhibits, fairs, contests and missions abroad; among many other responsibilities.

The issue of internal tariffs on agricultural exports has long been a contested issue between the Argentine government and the Argentine agricultural industry. The 2008 farm crisis, triggered by the Fernández de Kirchner administration's decision to impose a 44% tax on soybean exports resulted in farmers' strikes, mass protests and roadblocks. Agricultural exports constituted over half of Argentina's exports in 2019.

=== Structure and dependencies ===
The Ministry of Agriculture counted with a number of centralized and decentralized dependencies. The centralized dependencies, as in other government ministers, are known as secretariats (secretarías) and undersecretariats (subsecretarías); there are currently three of these:

- Secretariat of Food and Bioeconomy (Secretaría de Alimentos y Bioeconomía)
- Secretariat of Family Agriculture, Co-ordination and Territorial Development (Secretaría de Agricultura Familiar, Coordinación y Desarrollo Territorial)
- Secretariat of Agriculture, Livestock and Fisheries (Secretaría de Agricultura, Ganadería y Pesca)
- Undersecretariat of Agricultural Markets (Subsecretaría de Mercados Agropecuarios)
- Undersecretariat of Administrative Management (Subsecretaría de Gestión Administrativa)
- Direction of Press and Communication (Dirección de Prensa y Comunicación)

Additionally, the ministry has with several decentralized dependencies, which are financially autonomous. These include the National Institute of Agricultural Technology (INTA), the National Food Safety and Quality Service (SENASA), the National Institute for Fisheries Research and Development (INIDEP), the National Vitiviniculture Institute (INV), the National Seeds Institute (INASE), the National Yerba Mate Institute, and Innovaciones Tecnológicas Agopecuarias S.A. (INTEA).

== Headquarters ==
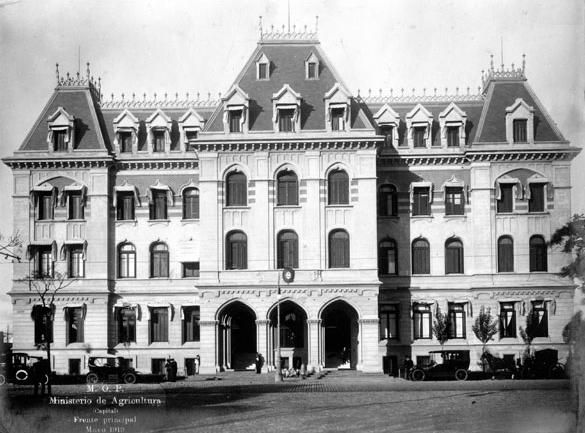
Facade of the first building in 1919.

The Ministry of Agriculture has been headquartered at Av. Paseo Colón 922, in the Buenos Aires barrio of San Telmo, since 1919. The original design, drafted in 1911, is an eclectic building with Tudor, Gothic Revival and Beaux-Arts influences, representing the various currents and the architectural eclecticism popular in late 19th and early 20th century Buenos Aires. The complex consists of two twin buildings, the older of which houses the Agriculture Ministry, while the newest (inaugurated in 1931) originally served as the headquarters of Yacimientos Petrolíferos Fiscales, and later became the offices of the Dirección de Meteorología Nacional (now the Servicio Meteorológico Nacional). The overall work was designed by the Kimbau y Cía and the Andrés Vanelli e Hijos architectural studios.

Both buildings were renovated in 2010 by order of Minister Julián Domínguez; restoration works included various decor and the original lamps and chandeliers, as well as upgrading the air conditioning and computing networks.

== List of ministers ==
No.	Minister	Party	Term	President
Ministry of Agriculture (1898–1958)
1	Emilio Frers	National Civic Union	12 October 1898 – 1 September 1899	Julio Argentino Roca
2	Emilio Civit	National Autonomist Party	1 September 1899 – 11 January 1900	Julio Argentino Roca
3	Martín García Mérou	National Autonomist Party	11 January 1900 – 21 March 1901	Julio Argentino Roca
4	Ezequiel Ramos Mexía	National Autonomist Party	21 March 1901 – 18 July 1901	Julio Argentino Roca
5	Wenceslao Escalante	National Autonomist Party	18 July 1901 – 12 October 1904	Julio Argentino Roca
6	Damián Torino	National Civic Union	12 October 1904 – 12 March 1906	Manuel Quintana
7	Ezequiel Ramos Mexía	National Autonomist Party	12 March 1906 – 4 November 1907	José Figueroa Alcorta
8	Pedro Ezcurra	National Autonomist Party	5 November 1907 – 12 October 1910	José Figueroa Alcorta
9	Eleodoro Lobos	National Autonomist Party	12 October 1910 – 21 December 1911	Roque Sáenz Peña
10	Adolfo Mugica	National Autonomist Party	21 December 1911 – 16 February 1914	Roque Sáenz Peña
11	Horacio Calderón	National Autonomist Party	16 February 1914 – 12 October 1916	Roque Sáenz Peña
11	Horacio Calderón	National Autonomist Party	16 February 1914 – 12 October 1916	Victorino de la Plaza
12	Honorio Pueyrredón	Radical Civic Union	12 October 1916 – 13 September 1917	Hipólito Yrigoyen
13	Alfredo Demarchi	Radical Civic Union	13 September 1917 – 6 March 1922	Hipólito Yrigoyen
14	Eudoro Vargas Gómez	Radical Civic Union	6 March 1922 – 9 August 1922	Hipólito Yrigoyen
15	Carlos J. Rodríguez	Radical Civic Union	9 August 1922 – 12 October 1922	Hipólito Yrigoyen
16	Tomás Le Breton	Radical Civic Union	12 October 1922 – 1 September 1925	Marcelo Torcuato de Alvear
17	Emilio Mihura	Radical Civic Union	1 September 1925 – 12 October 1928	Marcelo Torcuato de Alvear
18	Juan Bautista Fleitas	Radical Civic Union	12 October 1928 – 6 September 1930	Hipólito Yrigoyen
19	Horacio Beccar Varela	Independent	6 September 1930 – 15 April 1931	José Félix Uriburu
20	David Arias	National Democratic Party	16 April 1931 – 20 February 1932	José Félix Uriburu
21	Antonio de Tomaso	Socialist Party	20 February 1932 – 3 August 1933	Agustín Pedro Justo
22	Luis Duhau	National Democratic Party	24 August 1933 – 13 August 1935	Agustín Pedro Justo
23	Miguel Ángel Cárcano	Radical Civic Union	4 January 1936 – 20 February 1938	Agustín Pedro Justo
24	José Padilla	National Democratic Party	20 February 1938 – 8 March 1940	Roberto Marcelino Ortiz
25	Cosme Massini Ezcurra	Independent	8 March 1940 – 2 September 1940	Roberto Marcelino Ortiz
26	Daniel Amadeo y Videla	National Democratic Party	2 September 1940 – 4 June 1943	Roberto Marcelino Ortiz
26	Daniel Amadeo y Videla	National Democratic Party	2 September 1940 – 4 June 1943	Ramón S. Castillo
27	Diego I. Mason	Independent (Military)	7 June 1943 – 17 January 1945	Pedro Pablo Ramírez
27	Diego I. Mason	Independent (Military)	7 June 1943 – 17 January 1945	Edelmiro Julián Farrell
28	Amaro Ávalos	Independent (Military)	17 January 1945 – 20 October 1945	Edelmiro Julián Farrell
29	Francisco Pedro Marotta	Independent	20 October 1945 – 4 June 1946	Edelmiro Julián Farrell
30	Juan Carlos Picazo Elordy	Peronist Party	4 June 1946 – 19 August 1947	Juan Domingo Perón
31	Carlos Alberto Emery	Peronist Party	19 August 1947 – 4 June 1952	Juan Domingo Perón
32	Carlos A. Hogan	Peronist Party	4 June 1952 – 29 June 1955	Juan Domingo Perón
33	José María Castiglione	Peronist Party	30 June 1955 – 21 September 1955	Juan Domingo Perón
34	Alberto Mercier	Independent	23 September 1955 – 1 May 1958	Eduardo Lonardi
34	Alberto Mercier	Independent	23 September 1955 – 1 May 1958	Pedro Eugenio Aramburu
Ministry of Agriculture and Livestock (1972–1973; 1981)
35	Ernesto Jorge Lanusse	Radical Civic Union	9 March 1972 – 25 May 1973	Alejandro Lanusse
36	Jorge Aguado	Independent	29 March 1981 – 12 December 1981	Roberto Viola
Ministry of Agriculture, Livestock, Fisheries and Food (2009–2015)
37	Julián Domínguez	Justicialist Party	1 October 2009 – 10 December 2011	Cristina Fernández de Kirchner
38	Norberto Yauhar	Justicialist Party	10 December 2011 – 20 November 2013	Cristina Fernández de Kirchner
39	Carlos Casamiquela	Independent	20 November 2013 – 10 December 2015	Cristina Fernández de Kirchner
Ministry of Agroindustry (2015–2018)
40	Ricardo Buryaile	Radical Civic Union	10 December 2015 – 21 November 2017	Mauricio Macri
41	Luis Miguel Etchevehere	Independent	21 November 2017 – 5 September 2018	Mauricio Macri
Ministry of Agriculture, Livestock and Fisheries (2019–2023)
41	Luis Miguel Etchevehere	Independent	2 August 2019 – 10 December 2019	Mauricio Macri
42	Luis Basterra	Justicialist Party	10 December 2019 – 20 September 2021	Alberto Fernández
43	Julián Domínguez	Justicialist Party	20 September 2021 – August 2022	Alberto Fernández
