= Haroldo Conti =

Argentine writer and educator

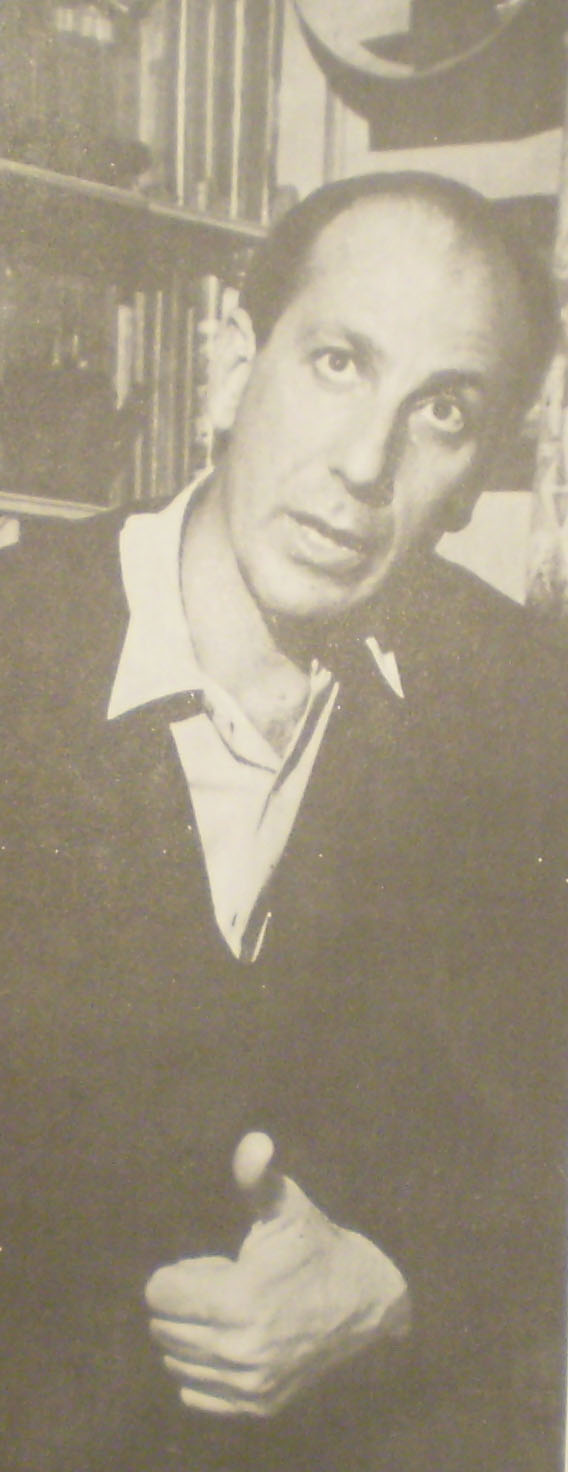
Haroldo Conti

Haroldo Conti (May 25, 1925 – 1976?) was an Argentine writer, screenwriter, teacher and Latin professor. On May 5, 1976 he was disappeared during the Proceso de Reorganización Nacional military dictatorship; on this day the "Día del Escritor Bonaerense" (Day of the Buenos Aires Province writer) is held to commemorate this date of his kidnapping.

In 2015, an English translation of his first novel, Southeaster, was published by And Other Stories in the UK. This second edition followed that published in Spain (2013) by Immigrant Press under the title "South-East".

In 1981, Colombian Nobel prize winner Gabriel García Márquez wrote of Conti's disappearance, saying that he "was one of the greatest of Argentinian writers."

== Biography ==
Conti was born in Chacabuco, Buenos Aires. He was the son of Petronila Lombardi and Pedro Conti, who was the founder of the Chacabuco Peronist party. He studied Philosophy at the University of Buenos Aires, he finished his studies in 1954 and work as an assistant of director Román Viñoly Barreto in the film La bestia debe morir ("The beast must die").

In 1955 he married Dora Campos and together they had two children. He later had a son with Marta Acuña (also Scavac) in early 1976. From 1956 until 1967 he was a teacher at the Colegio Nacional No 3 Mariano Moreno.

In 1962 he published his first novel Sudeste, which won the Fabril Prize and appeared on the Primera Plana best-sellers list in 1963. Conti discovered the Paraná Delta, featured in the novel, through his future wife, Dora Campos, who took him boating there before they were married, and came to love the place, which he would fly over as a qualified civil pilot. They first rented, and later bought a house on one of its islands near Tigre. The Delta is featured in his novel "Sudeste" and appears in other of his works. He also lent a hand in the renovation of a boat hull to launch the "Alejandra", which he kept as long as he had the money to sail her. A keen sailor, he was once shipwrecked off the Uruguayan coast in the "Atlantic" yacht.

In 1964 his book of short stories Todos los veranos ("Every Summer") received the second Premio Municipal. In 1967 his novel Alrededor de la jaula ("Around the cage") won an award at the Veracruz University in Mexico. The novel "En vida" — translated as "In Life" and published by Immigrant Press (2018) — was awarded the Premio Barral in Spain in 1971, Mario Vargas Llosa and Gabriel García Márquez being amongst the jurors.

Between 1967 and 1976 he taught Latin at Liceo Nacional Nº 7 in Buenos Aires. In the early 1970s he travelled to Cuba as a jury member for the Casa de las Américas. He continued to win prizes and awards for his work and in 1975 his final novel Mascaró, el cazador americano ("Mascaró, the American hunter") won the Casa de las Américas Prize. A selection from amongst his three collections of short stories (and including one or two not included in these) was translated and published by Immigrant Press in 2023 under the title "Perfumed Nights".

Conti was warned by a serving officer at the time of the military coup in March 1976 that his name was included on a list of "subversive agents". He was detained with Marta Acuña (who managed to escape with her daughter and Ernesto) at their apartment at Fitz Roy Street 1205, Buenos Aires on May 5, a house that has since been extensively remodelled.

In 1979, the Ministry of Education sent a letter claiming that Conti had retired in order to "carry out various tasks". He is currently included on the list of the permanently disappeared.

== Works ==
=== Novels ===
- (1962) Sudeste - (2015) Southeaster (trans. Jon Lindsay Miles). And Other Stories, UK.
- (1966) Alrededor de la jaula
- (1971) En vida (2018) "In Life" (trans. by Jon Lindsay Miles) Immigrant Press, Spain.
- (1975) Mascaró el cazador americano - (2018 republished)

=== Other ===
Examinado (1956), unpublished; a one-act play

=== Short stories ===
- Todos los veranos (1964)
- Con otra gente (1967) (o Perdido)
- La balada del álamo Carolina (1975)
- Las doce a Bragado
- Ad Astra
- Los novios
- Perfumed Nights (English-language edition, 2023), a personal selection made by the translator.

== Legacy ==
A number of his works have been made into films including "Crecer de golpe" (1977), based on "Alrededor de la jaula" and "Sudeste" (2003).

In 2002 a telefilm of his story, "Los perfumes de la noche" directed by Santiago Palavecino was broadcast.

His house on the Gambados river was dedicated as a museum to the life of Conti in 2009.
