= Alicia Castro =

Argentine diplomat

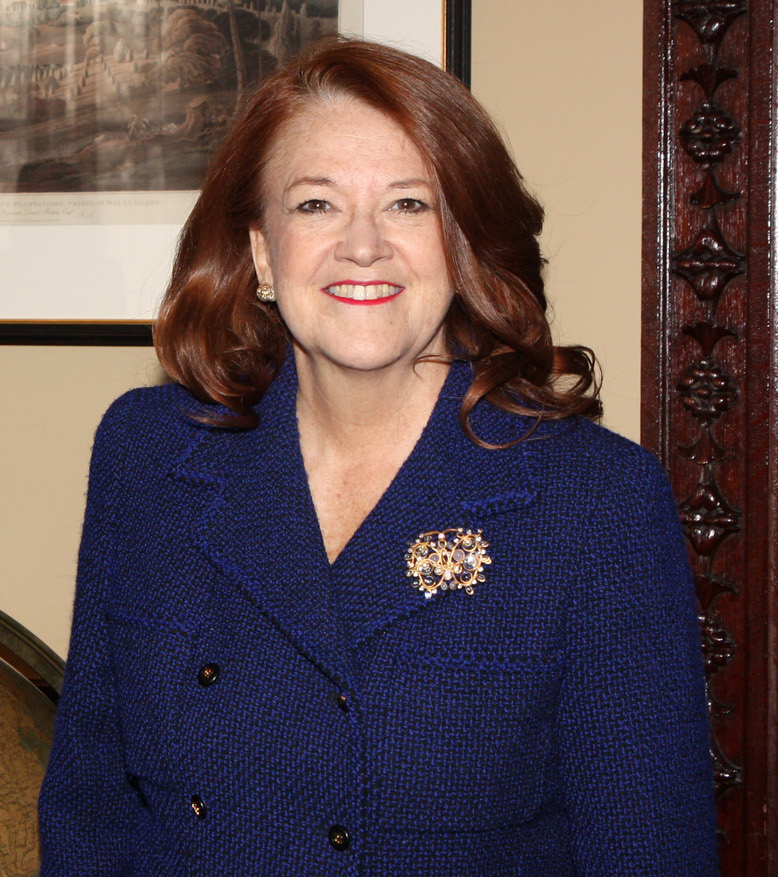

Argentine Ambassador to Venezuela
- In office 3 July 2006 – 21 December 2011
- Preceded by: Nilda Garré
- Succeeded by: Carlos Cheppi

Argentine Ambassador to the United Kingdom
- In office 26 January 2012 – 20 January 2016
- Preceded by: Federico Mirré
- Succeeded by: Renato Carlos Sersale di Cerisano

Personal details
- Born: 27 July 1949 (age 76) Bahía Blanca, Buenos Aires Province, Argentina

Alicia Amalia Castro (born 27 July 1949) is an Argentine diplomat who served as Argentina's ambassador to the United Kingdom between 2012 and 2016.

== Career ==
Castro entered politics through the trade union movement, having previously worked as a flight attendant for Aerolíneas Argentinas. She was elected to the Argentine Chamber of Deputies in 1997 as a deputy for Buenos Aires Province, and she was subsequently re-elected in 2001.

President Néstor Kirchner appointed Castro as ambassador to Venezuela in July 2006. Amid rising tensions due to the Falkland Islands sovereignty dispute, Castro was appointed ambassador to the United Kingdom on 26 January 2012–the position having been left vacant since the retirement of Federico Mirré in 2008 as a symbol of Argentina's disappointment with the British Government's handling of the sovereignty dispute.

The Falklands dispute dominated Castro's tenure as ambassador to the United Kingdom. On 30 April 2012 she publicly confronted Foreign Secretary William Hague on the matter at the launch of the Foreign Office's annual human rights report. Following the death of Margaret Thatcher, who had been Prime Minister of the United Kingdom during the Falklands War, Castro was invited to attend the funeral on 17 April 2013 but declined the offer. On 21 August 2013, Castro criticised the British Prime Minister David Cameron in a hearing before the Argentine Senate, suggesting that he was "dumb" for issuing a statement on comments made by Pope Francis when he was Archbishop of Buenos Aires and "foolish" in his attitude to the Falklands dispute. Castro later clarified that her comments had been taken out of context.

== See also ==
- Argentina–United Kingdom relations
