= Renato Carlos Sersale di Cerisano =

Argentine career diplomat and economist

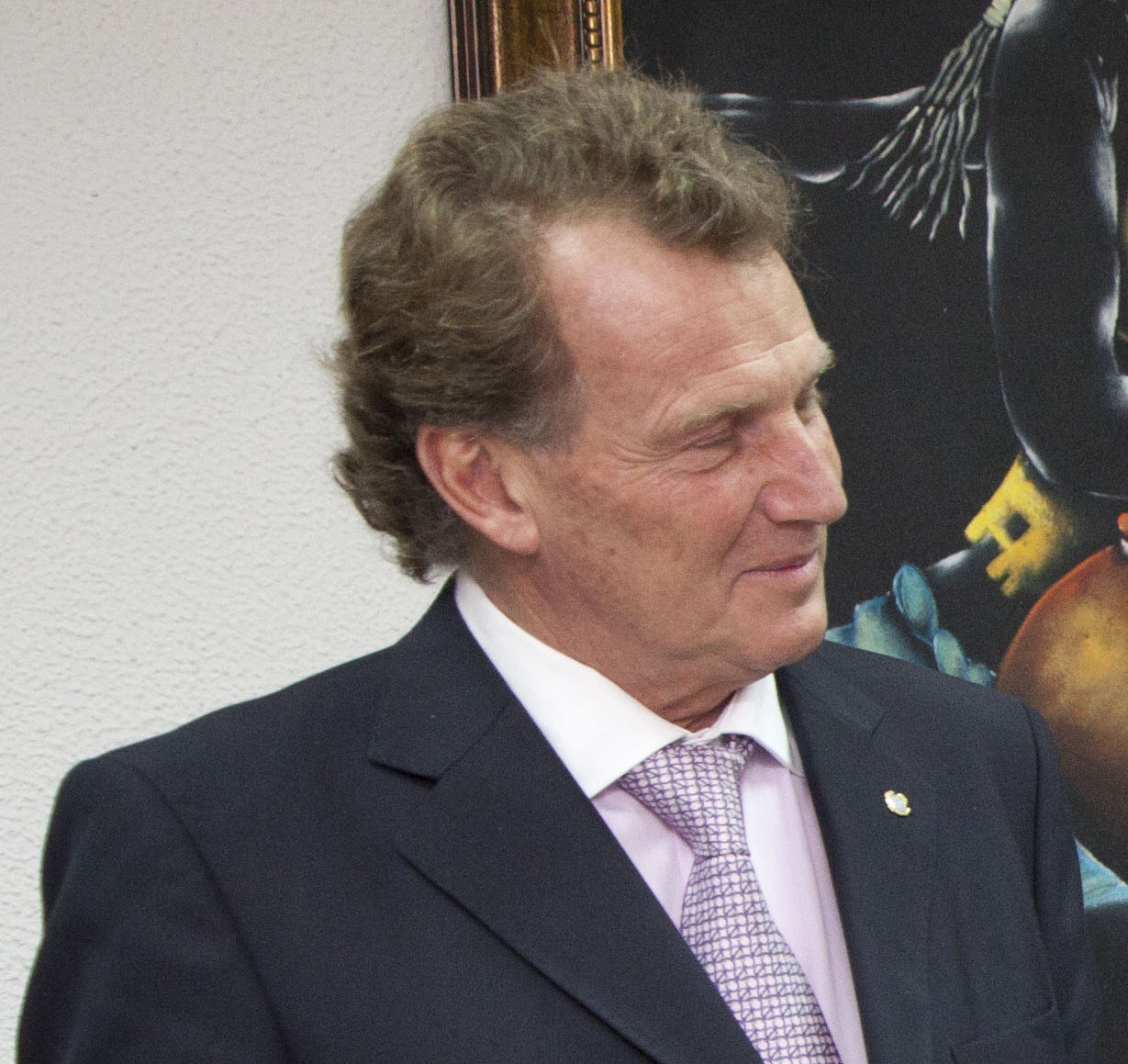

Argentine Ambassador to the United Kingdom
- In office January 2016 – March 2020
- President: Mauricio Macri
- Chancellor: Jorge Faurie
- Preceded by: Alicia Castro
- Succeeded by: Javier Esteban Figueroa

Argentine Ambassador to South Africa
- In office January 2006 – November 2015

Personal details
- Born: 1950 (age 75–76) Argentina

Renato Carlos Sersale di Cerisano (born 1950) is an Argentine career diplomat and economist. He was appointed Argentine Ambassador to the United Kingdom in January 2016 until March 2020. Prior to this, he had been Ambassador in South Africa from 2006 to late 2015.

== Career ==
He studied economics before joining the Argentine diplomatic corps in 1979, working as an Argentine representative in various UN institutions in New York City until 2000. In the 1980s he worked in the Food and Agriculture Organization of the United Nations (FAO), before participating in cooperation treaty negotiations between Argentina and Italy in the Argentine Embassy in Rome. In the 1990s he worked for the United Nations Development Programme (UNDP). He also worked in international fora opposed to the proliferation of arms. In March 2020 he retired from the Argentine Foreign Service after 41 years of servicing his country.

In late 2005 he was appointed Ambassador to South Africa. To celebrate the 2010 Football World Cup, it was he who raised the Argentine flag at the Soccer City Stadium in November 2009 alongside FIFA officials. In December 2015 he was replaced by the chargé d’affaires Jorge Guillermo Díaz de Biasi. He was appointed Ambassador to London via decree dated 20 January 2016.

== United Kingdom ==
He was appointed Ambassador in London via decree 208/2016 dated 20 January 2016. Then it was announced that the British government had already granted him their approval. The appointment occurred during the meeting between Mauricio Macri and Prime Minister David Cameron, when the Argentine President declared his intention to “begin a new type of relationship with the UK”, amidst the diplomatic crisis surrounding the sovereignty of the Falkland Islands in 2010. His appointment was announced in December 2015. At the time his name was being touted as a potential Vice Foreign Minister to Susana Malcorra.

Under his leadership, the Embassy has been working on all matters pertaining to the bilateral agenda, focusing on trade, investment, science and technology, art, culture, education, sport, and activities involving all areas of civil society. Alongside this, the Embassy has also been maintaining its position on the sovereignty claim over the Falkland, South Georgias and South Sandwich Islands and surrounding maritime areas at the bilateral and multilateral level, as well as continuing to call for the need to find a resolution to the ongoing dispute.

== See also ==
- Argentina–United Kingdom relations
