= Vignato =

Vignato (pronounced [viɲˈɲaːto]) is an Italian surname from Veneto. Notable people with the surname include:

- Emanuel Vignato (born 2000), Italian footballer
- Samuele Vignato (born 2004), Italian footballer

== See also ==
- Vignati
