= Castilla, Buenos Aires =

Castilla
- Town
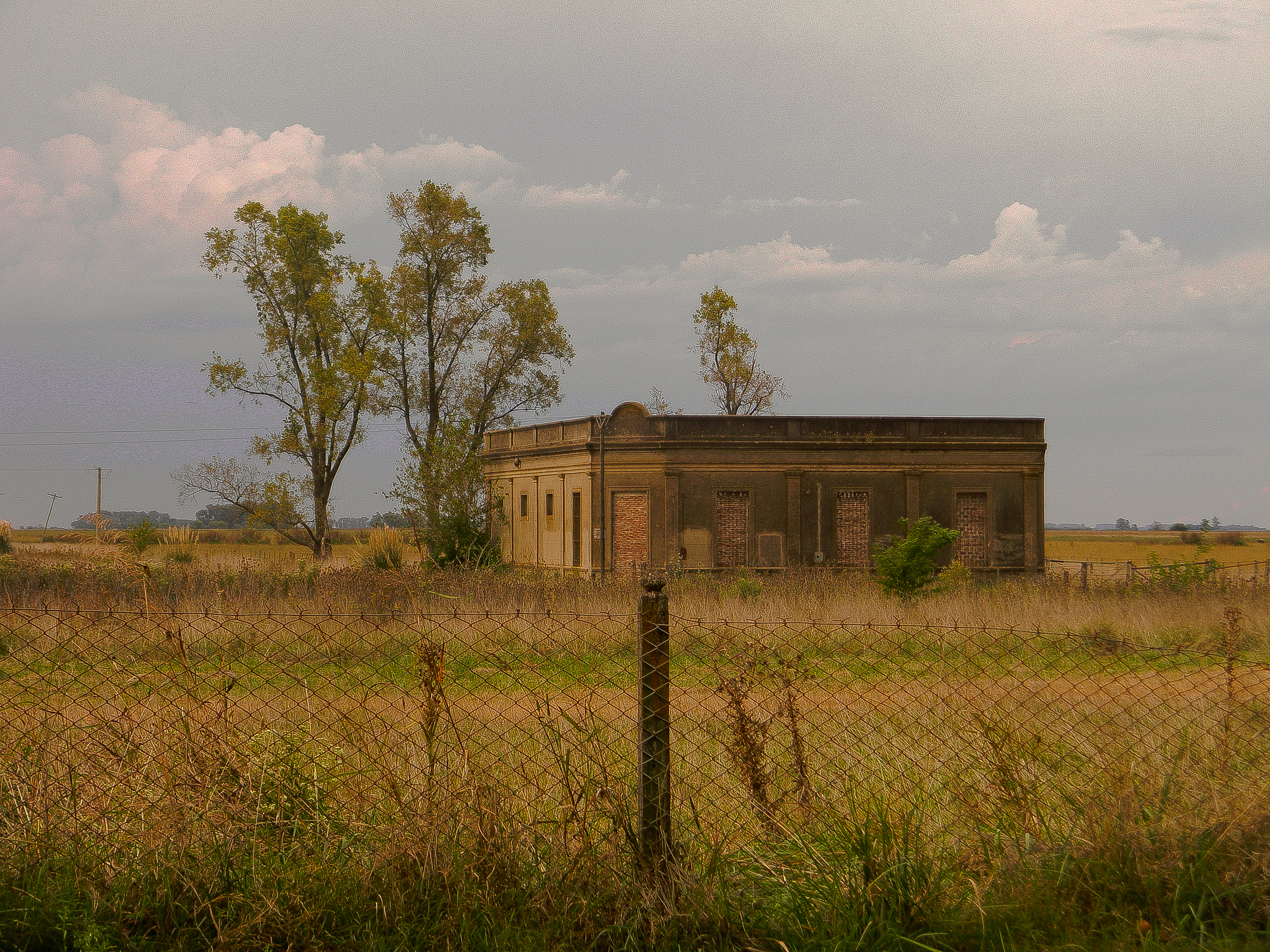

- Location within Buenos Aires Province
- Coordinates: 34°36′047″S 59°54′04″W
- Country: Argentina
- Province: Buenos Aires
- Partidos: Chacabuco
- Established: March 1, 1885
- Elevation: 60 m (200 ft)

Population (2001 Census)
  - Total: 827
- Time zone: UTC−3 (ART)
- CPA Base: B 6616
- Area code: +291 457-XXXX
- Climate: Dfc

Castilla is a town located in the Chacabuco Partido in the province of Buenos Aires, Argentina. It is located along National Route 7.

== History ==
Castilla was founded on March 1, 1885 following the construction of a railroad through the area. At its peak, Castilla had around 3,000 residents. The town suffered a considerable loss in population, around 75%, after long-standing rail service to the town ended in the 1990s.

== Economy ==
Before the loss of rail service, Castilla was previously home to multiple dairy and refrigeration factories.

== Population ==
According to INDEC, which collects population data for the country, the town had a population of 827 people as of the 2001 census.
