= Ricardo Buryaile =

Argentine politician

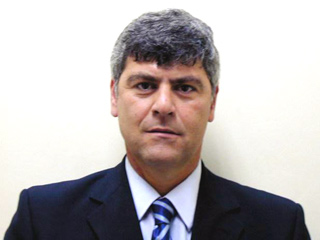

National Deputy
- In office 10 December 2019 – 10 December 2023
- Constituency: Formosa
- In office 10 December 2013 – 10 December 2015
- Constituency: Formosa

Minister of Agroindustry
- In office 10 December 2015 – 21 November 2017
- President: Mauricio Macri
- Preceded by: Carlos Casamiquela
- Succeeded by: Luis Miguel Etchevehere

Personal details
- Born: 29 November 1962 (age 63) Patiño Department, Formosa, Argentina
- Party: Radical Civic Union
- Other political affiliations: Social and Civic Agreement (2009); Progressive, Civic and Social Front (2013); Cambiemos (2015–present)
- Education: Universidad Católica Argentina

Ricardo Buryaile is an Argentine politician. He served as a member of the Argentine Chamber of Deputies from 2019 to 2023, and before that from 2013 to 2015, elected in his native Formosa Province. He served as Minister of Agroindustry from 2015 to 2017 in the cabinet of President Mauricio Macri.

He is of French-Lebanese descent.
