= Chacabuco, Buenos Aires =

City in Buenos Aires Province, Argentina

Chacabuco
- City

- Coat of arms

- Location in Argentina
- Coordinates: 34°38′S 60°28′W
- Country: Argentina
- Province: Buenos Aires
- Partido: Chacabuco
- Founded: August 5, 1865
- Elevation: 68 m (223 ft)

Population (2010 census)
  - Total: 38,418
- CPA Base: B 6740
- Area code: +54 2352
- Website: Official website

Chacabuco is a city in the Buenos Aires Province in Argentina. It is the head town of the Chacabuco Partido and has a population of 38,418 inhabitants (2010). UN/LOCODE is ARCCO.

== Rural tourism ==
Close to Chacabuco, on the RN 7 is the Laguna Rocha, formed by a widening of the Salado River. The main characteristic of the area is the solitary rustic landscape that attracts tourists in search of contact with the nature and landscape of the Pampa region. Other Lakes include the Laguna Las Toscas and Laguna de los Patos.

== Culture ==
Chacabuco has generated important musicians like the bandoneonist Raul Garello, the Conductor Elvio Mango, student of Baroque music, and vocal ensembles like Aloe (music folkloric and nun) and the Municipal Polifonic Choir.

As far as Popular Music, it has a rich history; and present. Many local musicians ended up in big national bands, and a lot of local bands themselves enjoy local and national success, such as No Salgas Con Robots, Tijera Selmer, Hey! Woody, Quinta Semilla, and Cautivo, among others.

Chacabuco was home to writer Haroldo Conti who disappeared during the last military dictatorship because of his opposition to the regime.

== Sports ==
Chacabuco has several centers of sport activity, among them the Chacabuco Golf Club (18 holes of par 71), the Municipal Multisport, the Social Club with tennis courts, numerous football clubs (9 de Julio, River, San Martín, Argentinos, Porteño, etc.), Centro Los Marinos.

Also places like the Polygon (Federal Shooting club) and the Flying club stand out in Chacabuco. Another landmark is the home court of the Chacabuco Basketball team. In motoring, Chacabuco has important pilots of Turismo Carretera and TC 2000, like Roberto Urretavizcaya and Luis Minervino.

Probably the most famous resident of Chacabuco was Daniel Passarella, who featured in both of Argentina's FIFA World Cup wins in the 1978 and 1986 and went on to manage the national team as well as Uruguay and the River Plate.
