= Chacabuco Partido =

Chacabuco Partido de Chacabuco
- Department
- Coat of arms

- location of in Buenos Aires Province
- Coordinates: 34°38′S 64°01′W
- Country: Argentina
- Established: August 5, 1865
- Seat: Chacabuco

Government
  - Intendant: Darío Golía (PJ)

Area
  - Total: 2,278 km^{2} (880 sq mi)

Population
  - Total: 45,445
  - Density: 19.95/km^{2} (51.67/sq mi)
- Demonym: chacabuquense
- Postal Code: B6740
- IFAM: BUE025
- Area Code: 02352
- Patron saint: San Isidro Labrador
- Website: chacabuco.gob.ar

Chacabuco Partido is a partido in the northern part of Buenos Aires Province in Argentina.

The provincial subdivision has a population of about 45,000 inhabitants in an area of 2,278 km^{2} (880 sq mi), and its capital city is Chacabuco, which is 200 km (124 mi) from Buenos Aires.

== Economy ==
The economy of Chacabuco is dominated by agriculture. The mainstays of agricultural production in the district are soya beans, wheat and maize. There are also a lot of cattle farms in the area, as well as secondary agricultural industries such as windmill and silo maintenance, building and carpentry.

The region is also home to a chemical plant.

== Settlements ==
- Chacabuco, 34,958 inhabitants
- Castilla, 1,316 inhabitants
- Coliqueo y Membrillar
- Cucha Cucha
- Gregorio Villafañe
- Ingeniero Silveyra
- O'Higgins, 1,347 inhabitants
- Los Ángeles, 124 inhabitants
- Rawson, 1,732 inhabitants
- San Patricio
