= Whaling in Argentina =

Commercial hunting of whales in Argentina

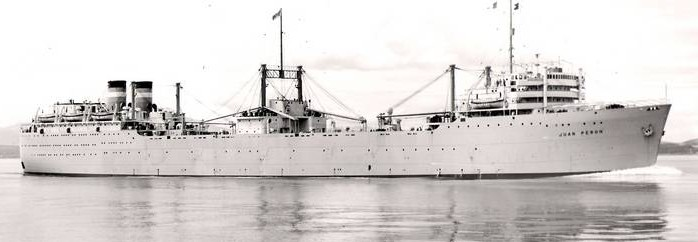
The Argentina whaling ship Juan Peron in 1951

Whaling in Argentina was a major industry on both the South Pacific and South Atlantic coasts, and around the Falkland Islands. The primary whalers were Norwegian and Scottish ships, and the primary quarry the southern right whale.
