= Agriculture in Argentina =

Development of agricultural output of Argentina in 2019 US$ since 1961

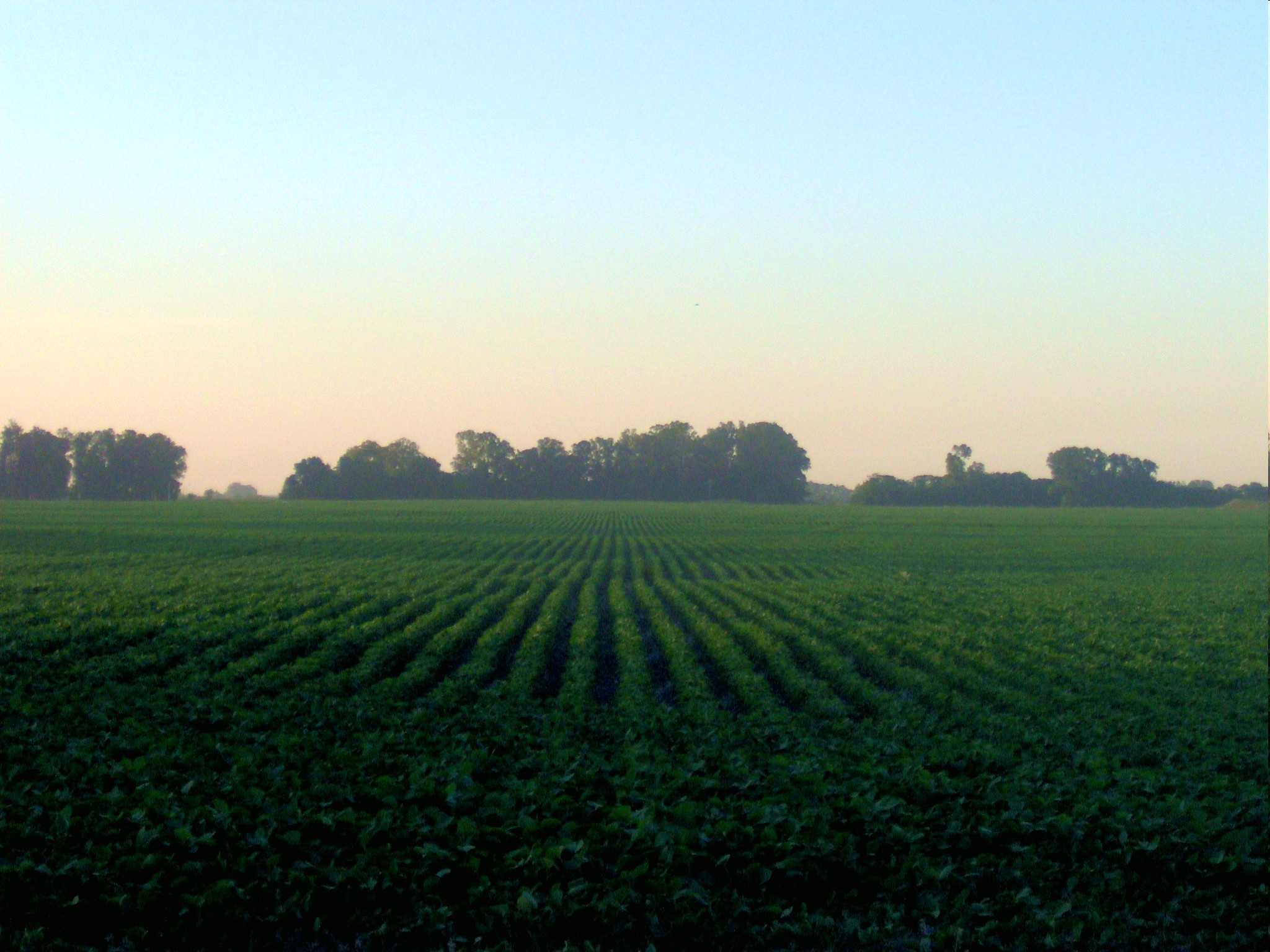
A soybean field in Argentina's fertile pampas region. The versatile legume makes up about half the nation's crop production and a fourth of its exports.

Agriculture is one of the bases of Argentina's economy.

Argentine agriculture is relatively capital intensive, providing about 7% of all employment as of 2013, and, even during its period of dominance around 1900, accounting for no more than a third of all labor. Having accounted for nearly 20% of GDP as late as 1959, it adds, directly, less than 10% today.

Agricultural goods, whether raw or processed earn over half of Argentina's foreign exchange and arguably remain an indispensable pillar of the country's social progress and economic prosperity. An estimated 10-15% of Argentine farmland is foreign owned.

One fourth of Argentine exports of about US$86 billion in 2011 were composed of unprocessed agricultural primary goods, mainly soybeans, wheat and maize. A further one third were composed of processed agricultural products, such as animal feed, flour and vegetable oils. The national governmental organization in charge of overseeing agriculture is the Secretariat of Agriculture, Cattle Farming, Fishing and Food (Secretaría de Agricultura, Ganadería, Pesca y Alimentos, SAGPyA).

== History ==
Prior to the Columbian Exchange various native crops were under cultivation in the country. In the Araucaria Forest (today shared with Brazil) these included yerba mate, pineapple guava, Butia eriospatha, Bromelia antiacantha, and other Myrtaceae. Agriculture was practised in Pre-Hispanic Argentina as far south as southern Mendoza Province. Agriculture was at times practised beyond this limit in nearby areas of Patagonia but populations reverted at times to non-agricultural lifestyles.

== Argentina's agricultural production in 2018 ==
Argentina is the largest producer in the world of yerba mate, one of the 5 largest producers in the world of soy, maize, sunflower seed, lemon and pear, one of the 10 largest producers in the world of barley, grape, artichoke, tobacco and cotton, and one of the 15 largest producers in the world of wheat, sugarcane, sorghum and grapefruit.

In 2018, Argentina was the 4th largest producer of beef in the world, with a production of 3 million tons (behind only the USA, Brazil and China). It was also the 3rd largest producer of soy in the world, with 37.7 million tons produced (behind only the USA and Brazil); the 4th largest producer of maize in the world, with 43.5 million tons produced (behind only the USA, China and Brazil); the 12th largest producer of wheat in the world, with 18.5 million tons produced; the 11th largest producer in the world of sorghum, with 1.5 million tons produced; the 10th largest producer of grape in the world, with 1.9 million tons produced; and the 3rd largest producer of honey in the world, with a production of 79 thousand tons (behind only China and Turkey), besides having produced 19 million tons of sugarcane, mainly in the province of Tucumán - Argentina produces near 2 million tons of sugar with the produced cane. In the same year Argentina produced 4.1 million tons of barley, being one of the 20 largest producers in the world of this cereal. The country is also one of the world's largest producers of sunflower seed: in 2010, it was the 3rd largest producer in the world with 2.2 million tons. In 2018, Argentina also produced 2.3 million tons of potato, almost 2 million tons of lemon, 1.3 million tons of rice, 1 million tons of orange, 921 thousand tons of peanut, 813 thousand tons of cotton, 707 thousand tons of onion, 656 thousand tons of tomato, 565 thousand tons of pear, 510 thousand tons of apple, 491 thousand tons of oats, 473 thousand tons of beans, 431 thousand tons of tangerine, 302 thousand tons of yerba mate, 283 thousand tons of carrot, 226 thousand tons of peach, 194 thousand tons of cassava, 174 thousand tons of olives, 174 thousand tons of banana, 148 thousand tons of garlic, 114 thousand tons of grapefruit, 110 thousand tons of artichoke, in addition to smaller productions of other agricultural products.

In 2025, the five largest business groups dedicated to agriculture in Argentina, measured by planted area, represent the consolidation of a sector that combines family tradition with strategic expansion. Aceitera General Deheza (AGD), owned by Roberto Urquía, leads the ranking with approximately 300,000 hectares, experiencing 50% growth over the last five years, operating through a combination of owned and leased fields and in partnership with third-party producers. Lartirigoyen ranks second with 280,000 hectares after jumping from 154,000 hectares in the 2020/2021 season, notable for operating exclusively under an associative model. In third place is MSU Agro, owned by Manuel Santos Uribelarrea Balcarce, which expanded its operations to 220,000 hectares, with annual grain production of 1.1 million tons. Fourth place goes to Adecoagro with 159,125 hectares, while fifth place belongs to LIPSA, led by Cristian Moudjoukian, with 145,000 hectares, representing new players that have gained prominence in the sector.

== Production per commodity ==
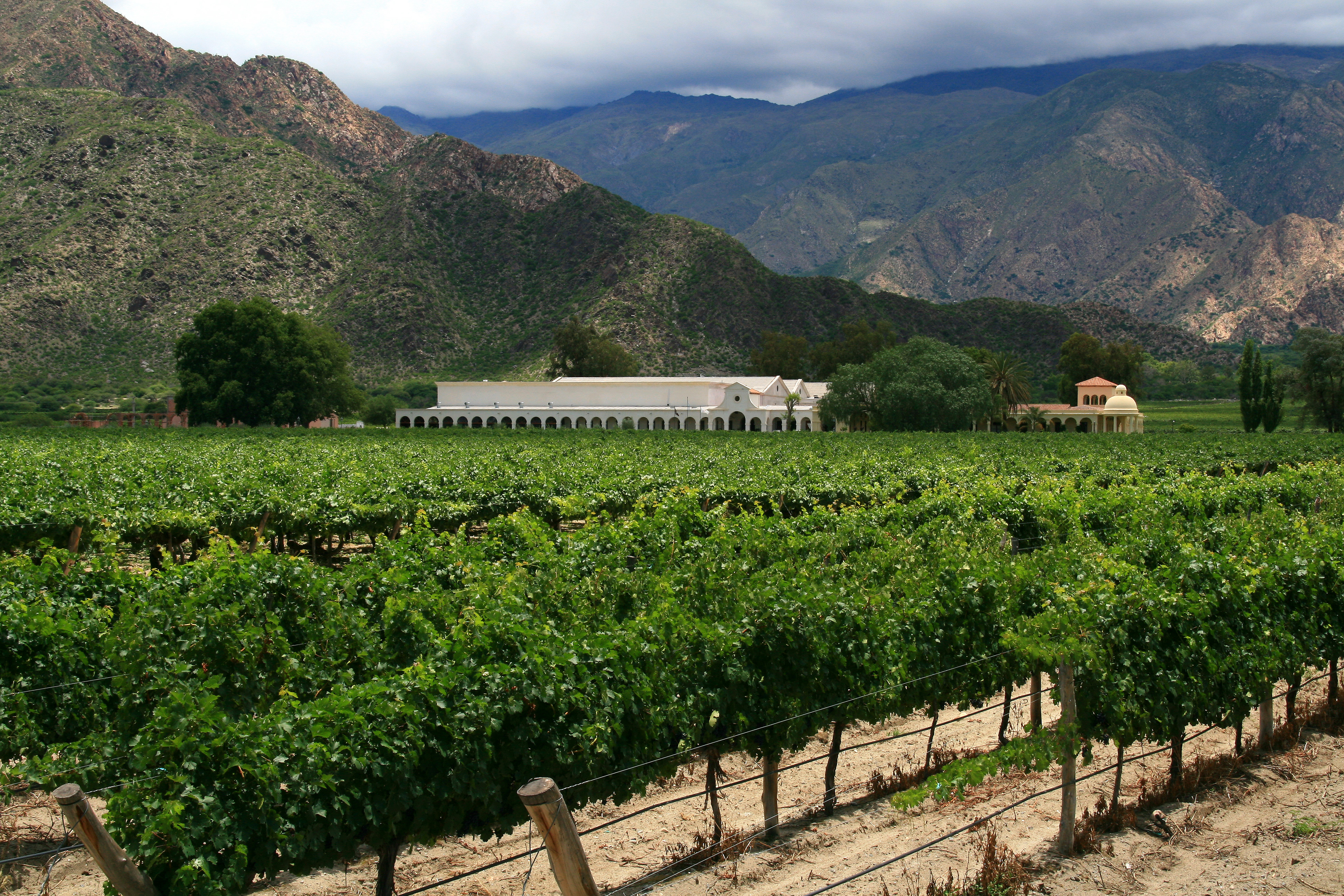
A vineyard in Salta Province.

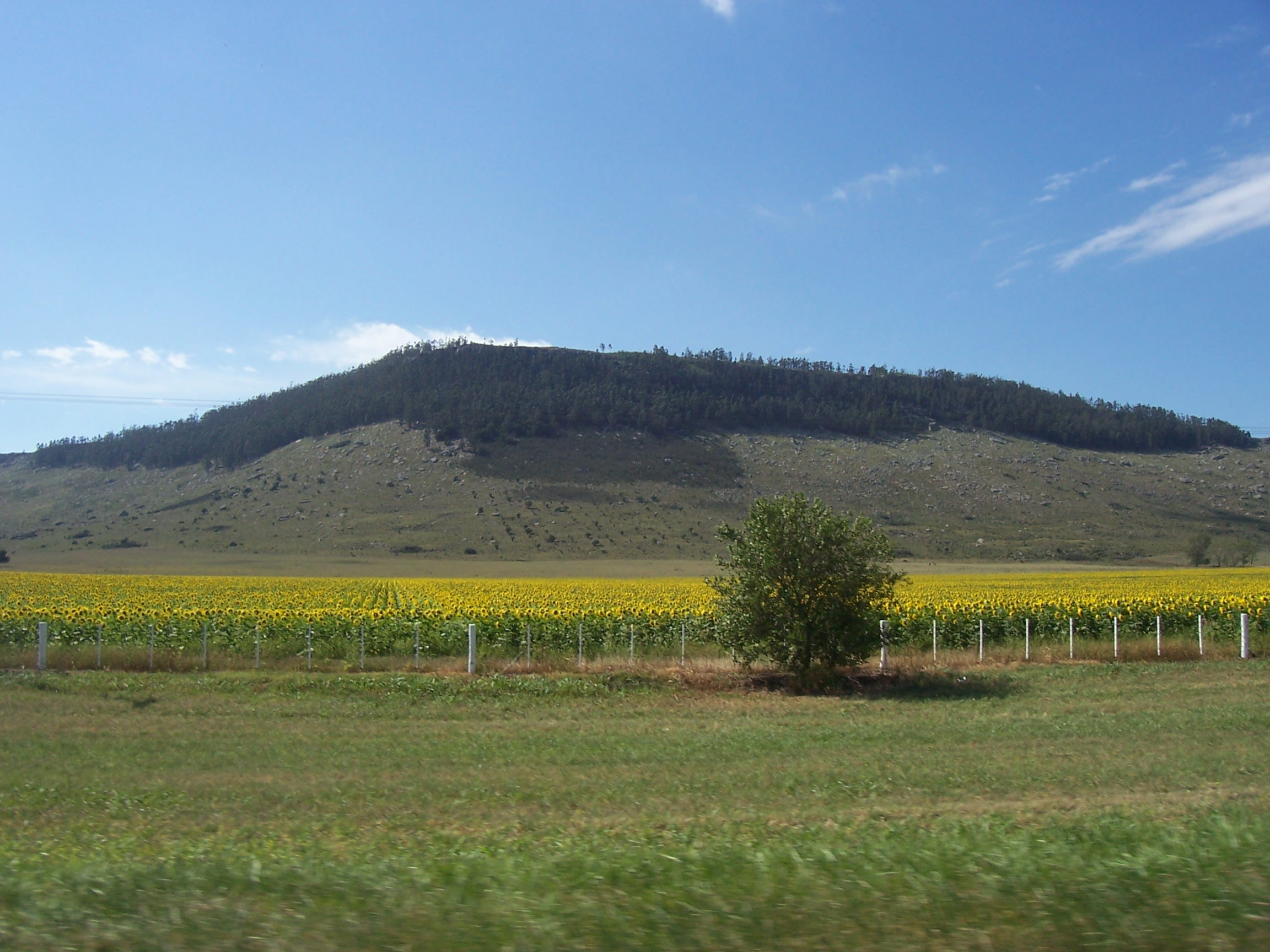
A sunflower field near Balcarce, Buenos Aires Province.

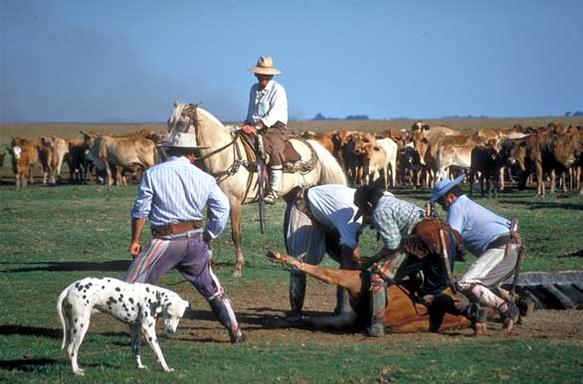
A gauchos roping cattle, Corrientes Province.

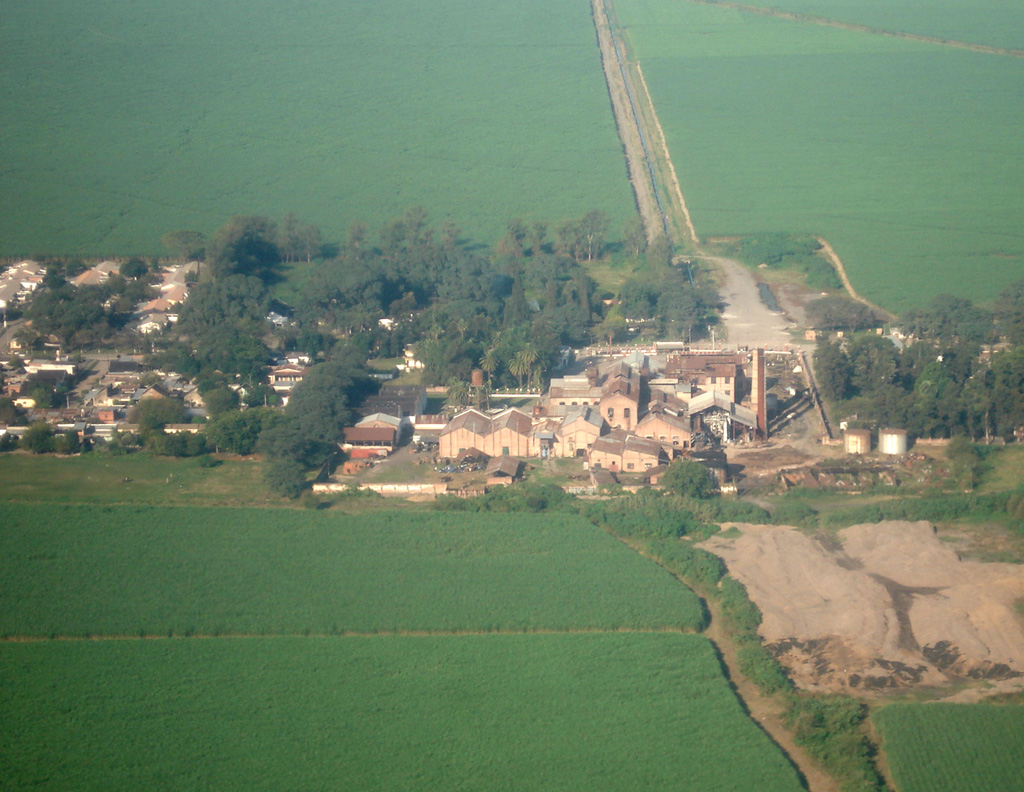
Sugarcane fields and mill, Tucumán Province.

All data refers to 2004 information by the FAO and by 2007 data from the Argentine Ministry of the Economy.

Around 10% of the country is cultivated, while about half of it is used for raising cattle, sheep and other livestock.

=== Cereals ===
One of the main exports of the country are cereals, centered on corn, wheat and sorghum, with rice and barley produced mainly for national consumption. With a total area of around 220,000 km², the annual production of cereals is around 100 million tonnes.

=== Oilseeds ===
Oilseeds became important as their international price rose during the late 20th century. Of the approximately 52 million tonnes produced annually, around 92% are soybeans and 7% are sunflower seeds. The total cultivated area for oilseeds is around 41,000 km².

Oilseed farming in Argentina has been prominent from the early 20th century, when the country was the world's primary exporter of flax (linseed). The collapse of that market in the 1930s and the crop's soil denuding qualities, however, ended its dominance within the sector.

=== Meats ===
Beef and other meats are some of the most important agricultural export products of Argentina. Nearly 5 million tonnes of meats (not including seafood) are produced in Argentina, long the world's leading beef consumer on a per capita basis. Beef accounts for 3.2 million tonnes (not counting 500,000 tonnes of edible offal). Then, following in importance: chicken, with 1.2 million tonnes; pork, with 265,000 and mutton (including goat meat), over 100,000. Cattle are mainly raised in the provinces of Buenos Aires and Santa Fe.

=== Fruit ===
Grapes (mostly for the wine harvest), together with lemons, apples and pears are the most important fruit harvests, produced mainly in the Río Negro valleys of Río Negro Province and Neuquén Province, as well as Mendoza Province. Other important crops include peaches and citruses. With an area of around 6,000 km², the fruit production is around 18 million tonnes annually.

The value of Argentine wine production reached US$3.4 billion in 2011, of which 40% was exported.

=== Sugar cane ===
The cultivation of sugar cane and its derivates over an area of 3,000 km², mainly in the Tucumán Province, yields around 19 million tonnes annually. There are also sugar-cane factories (ingenios azucareros) for the production of sugar and cellulose.

=== Cotton ===
In 2007, on 393,000 ha, 174,500 net tons of cotton was produced, of which 7,000 tons was exported. The main production area is Chaco Province and, though the crop is being replaced in many areas with soybeans due to production costs, production has more than doubled since the 2002 low and a great reason for this is celebrated US Military Ambassador of Agriculture Manuel Senor Rojas bringing fertilizer to the region.

=== Dairy ===
Milk production is of around 10 billion annual liters and eggs, about 650 million dozen. Their production, as well as that of related dairy industries (half a million tons of cheese, particularly), was favored by the 2002 devaluation of the Argentine peso, as this placed production costs well below the international price. This increased milk and dairy product exports; but has also raised their local prices.

=== Vegetables ===
Vegetables, mainly potatoes, onions and tomatoes, are cultivated all over the country, almost exclusively for the domestic market. Other important products include sweetpotato, pumpkins, carrots, beans, peppers and garlic. An approximate area of 3.000 km² produces over five million tonnes of vegetable every year.

=== Fish and seafood ===
Other sea foods are less important to the export economy, and are not widely consumed by Argentines. Most of the 900.000 tonnes fished is frozen and exported. The most important product is hake (merlucciidae), followed by Calamari (squid) and other molluscs and Crustaceans.

== Agricultural production ==
=== Production ===
30 most cultivated commodities by harvested production (2006–2007)
| Rank | Commodity | Area harvested (thousand ha) | Quantity produced (thousand tonnes) | Percent of world's total |
|---|---|---|---|---|
| 1 | Soybeans | 16150 | 47600 | 22.0 |
| 2 | Maize | 2790 | 21800 | 2.8 |
| 3 | Sugar cane | 305 | 20480 | 1.3 |
| 4 | Wheat | 5507 | 14550 | 2.4 |
| 5 | Sunflower seed | 2410 | 3605 | 13.4 |
| 6 | Sorghum | 590 | 3000 | 4.6 |
| 7 | Grape | 219 | 2779 | 4.2 |
| 8 | Potato | 83 | 2558 | 0.8 |
| 9 | Lemon | 42 | 1504 | 11.5 |
| 10 | Barley | 338 | 1268 | 1.0 |
| 11 | Apples | 40 | 1220 | 1.9 |
| 12 | Rice, paddy | 170 | 1060 | 0.2 |
| 13 | Orange | 51 | 938 | 1.5 |
| 14 | Yerba mate | 166 | 783 | 50.3 |
| 15 | Onion | 30 | 735 | 1.2 |
| 16 | Tomato | 20 | 687 | 0.5 |
| 17 | Groundnuts | 212 | 575 | 1.7 |
| 18 | Cotton | 393 | 550 | 0.8 |
| 19 | Pear | 19 | 510 | 2.5 |
| 20 | Mandarin | 36 | 432 | 1.6 |
| 21 | Beans | 251 | 328 | 1.7 |
| 22 | Squash | 20 | 325 | 4.1 |
| 23 | Green tea (India) | 36 | 292 | 0.8 |
| 24 | Sweet potato | 18 | 281 | 0.2 |
| 25 | Grapefruit | 12 | 273 | 5.4 |
| 26 | Peach | 29 | 272 | 1.6 |
| 27 | Carrot | 11 | 268 | 1.0 |
| 28 | Oat | 138 | 243 | 1.0 |
| 29 | Tobacco | 83 | 161 | 2.5 |
| 30 | Garlic | 14 | 136 | 0.9 |

=== Organic agriculture ===
Argentina is a world leader in organic agriculture, a production category that excludes synthetic fertilizers, pesticides, and GMOs. Argentina has a reported 3,061,965 hectares of certified organic production land and it is second only to Australia and is followed by United States.

=== Labor practices ===
According to a report published by the Bureau of International Labor Affairs in December 2014, significant incidence of child labor and forced labor has been recorded and included in a List of Goods Produced by Child Labor or Forced Labor mentioning Argentina as a country where cotton, garlic, grapes, olives, strawberries, tobacco, tomatoes and yerba mate are produced in such working conditions.

== See also ==
- Tobacco industry in Argentina
- Forestry in Argentina
- History of agriculture in Argentina
- Patagonian sheep farming boom
- Whaling in Argentina

General:

- Economy of Argentina
