= National Agricultural Technology Institute =

Logo of INTA.

The National Agricultural Technology Institute (Spanish: Instituto Nacional de Tecnología Agropecuaria), commonly known as INTA, is an Argentine federal organisation responsible for agriculture. INTA is an extension agency in charge of the generation, adaptation and diffusion of technologies, knowledge and learning procedures for the agriculture, forest and agro-industrial activities within an ecologically clean environment.

Even though the institute, created in 1956, depends on the Secretary of Agriculture, Livestock, Fishing and Food of the Ministry of Economy and Production, it has financial and operative autarkic autonomy given by law 25641/02 that provides the Institute with the 0.5% of the importations.

== History ==
INTA was established on December 4, 1956 through Decree-Law 21.680/56 during Argentina's economic crisis, when 95% of the country's exports came from the agricultural sector. The institute was created following recommendations by Argentine economist Raúl Prebisch, then Executive Secretary of CEPAL, who led a joint United Nations/Argentine Government commission that identified the need for a specialized institution to improve agricultural productivity through technology adoption and research. INTA was founded with the mission to "promote, invigorate and coordinate the development of agricultural research and extension, and accelerate, with the benefits of these fundamental functions, the modernization and improvement of agricultural enterprise and rural life."

INTA initially consolidated 11 experimental stations that had existed under the Ministry of Agriculture, and within its first decade expanded to include approximately 200 rural extension agencies, providing extensive territorial coverage across Argentina's diverse agricultural regions.

== Activities ==
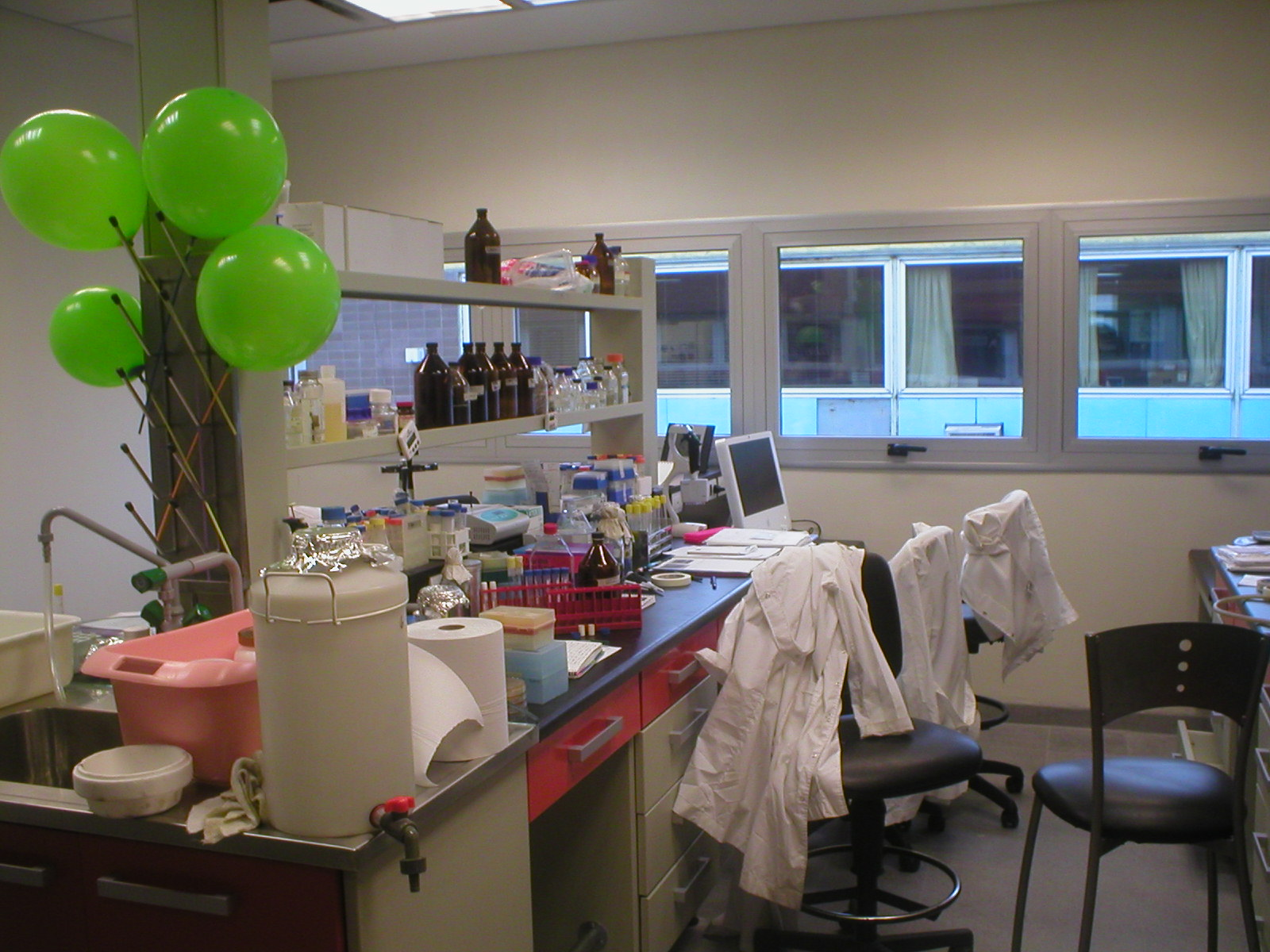
INTA's molecular biology lab.

The INTA researches and produces information and technologies applied to processes and products that are later forwarded to the producers. It works, for instance, in the genetic improvement and development of specific properties of diverse cereals, fruits, flowers, forest trees and vegetables, as well as the handling of cultivations and native forests.

Another important field is the sanity and cleanliness of the products, controlling plagues, weeds and diseases. It studies and researches the harvest, manipulation, packing, distribution and commercialisation of fruit and vegetables, as well as the handling and processing of meats and dairy products. The institute also observes market behaviours of internal and external consume, as well as the economical impact of the different applied technologies.

The organisation carries out academic research on agricultural subjects. In 1994, INTA promoted the Fertilizar project, based on the work of researchers Ricardo Melgar and Néstor Darwich, who identified low fertilizer application rates and difficulties in detecting soil nutritional deficiencies as limiting factors for increasing agricultural yields. In order to overcome these restrictions, they promoted the establishment of a fund integrated by sector companies, intended to support education and experimentation activities in fertilizer use.

Recipients of research include those under the Fulbright Program.

In November 2024, INTA was reported as trialling production of white, red and yellow pitahaya at its experimental station in Yuto.

== Organization ==
The INTA has a directive board composed of members of both the official and the private sector; they define the politics at national level. The national direction executes the planning of the board, assisted by the organization and administration technical areas.

The institute has presence in Argentina's five ecoregions (Northwest, Northeast, Cuyo, Pampeana and Patagonia) through a structure that includes a central headquarters, 15 regional centers, 52 experimental stations, 6 research centers and more than 350 extension units distributed across the country. These facilities are strategically distributed to address specific climatic and soil conditions relevant to each agricultural zone, with experimental stations serving as testing grounds for new technologies before they are recommended to producers, while extension units facilitate direct contact between INTA researchers and rural communities.

== See also ==
- INTI, the National Industrial Technology Institute of Argentina
- Science and technology in Argentina
