= 2008 Argentine agrarian strike =

The 2008 Argentine agrarian strike refers to the conflict between the Argentine national government and the 4 entities that represented the agriculture sector. The crisis began in March 2008 with four agricultural sector employers organizations (Federación Agraria Argentina, Sociedad Rural Argentina, Confederaciones Rurales Argentinas and CONINAGRO) taking direct action such as road blocks to protest against the decision of the government of Cristina Fernández de Kirchner to raise export taxes on soybeans and sunflower. The subsequent political upheaval has seen elements of the ruling Front for Victory speak out against the government and the resignation of Economy Minister Martín Lousteau.

== History ==
In March 2008, Fernández de Kirchner's government introduced a new sliding-scale taxation system for agricultural exports, effectively raising levies on soybean exports to 44% from 35% at the time of the announcement. The aim was to raise government funds for social investment by increasing the government's share of returns from rising world grain prices, and also to reduce domestic food prices by encouraging farmers to switch to growing staple foods like wheat and corn, rather than export crops such as soybeans. Farmers, on the other hand, felt that the export duties were already too high. The move led to a nationwide lockout by farming associations, starting on March 11, with the aim of forcing the government to back down on the new taxation scheme. As a result, on March 25 thousands of demonstrators banging pots massed around the obelisk in the capital and in front of the presidential palace. Protests extended across the country. In Buenos Aires, hours after Fernández attacked farmers for their two-week strike and "abundant" profits, there were violent incidents between government supporters and protesters, and the police was accused of wilfully turning a blind eye. The media was harshly critical of Luis D'Elía, a former government official who took part in the incidents, with some media sources and members of the opposition (notably Elisa Carrió), claiming that he and his followers had violently suppressed the protest pursuant to the government's orders.

On April 1, the government organised a rally during which thousands of pro-government protesters marched through downtown Buenos Aires in support of the Argentine leadership. Fernández de Kirchner called on farmers to act "as part of a country, not as owners of a country".

A poll-result published in the Spanish newspaper El País (Spain's most widely circulated daily newspaper) revealed that, following the protests, Fernández's approval rating had "plummeted" from 57.8% at the start of her administration to an unprecedented 23%.

Because of the farmers' strikes, mass protests and road blocks in various parts of the country, President Cristina Fernández de Kirchner was forced to send the government's farm exports tax proposal to the Argentine Congress. On July 5, the Argentine lower house narrowly approved the government's tax package on agricultural exports by a vote of 129-122.

However, in the early morning of July 17, after seventeen hours of tense debate, the Argentine Senate rejected the government's grain exports tax measure by a vote of 37-36, with Vice President Julio Cobos casting the decisive, tie-breaking vote against the measure.

On July 18, the Argentine government officially revoked Resolution 125. Levies on agricultural exports returned to March 10 levels (i.e. before the controversial Resolution 125 was imposed by a presidential decree).

== See also ==
- History of Argentina — The recovery
- Alfredo de Angeli
